

616001–616100 

|-bgcolor=#d6d6d6
| 616001 ||  || — || January 16, 2005 || Kitt Peak || Spacewatch ||  || align=right | 3.3 km || 
|-id=002 bgcolor=#E9E9E9
| 616002 ||  || — || May 14, 2015 || Haleakala || Pan-STARRS ||  || align=right data-sort-value="0.91" | 910 m || 
|-id=003 bgcolor=#d6d6d6
| 616003 ||  || — || October 10, 2008 || Mount Lemmon || Mount Lemmon Survey ||  || align=right | 2.3 km || 
|-id=004 bgcolor=#d6d6d6
| 616004 ||  || — || November 26, 2014 || Haleakala || Pan-STARRS ||  || align=right | 2.3 km || 
|-id=005 bgcolor=#C2FFFF
| 616005 ||  || — || January 18, 2005 || Kitt Peak || Spacewatch || L5 || align=right | 7.8 km || 
|-id=006 bgcolor=#E9E9E9
| 616006 ||  || — || February 2, 2005 || Kitt Peak || Spacewatch ||  || align=right data-sort-value="0.76" | 760 m || 
|-id=007 bgcolor=#E9E9E9
| 616007 ||  || — || December 20, 2004 || Mount Lemmon || Mount Lemmon Survey ||  || align=right data-sort-value="0.89" | 890 m || 
|-id=008 bgcolor=#E9E9E9
| 616008 ||  || — || February 2, 2005 || Kitt Peak || Spacewatch ||  || align=right data-sort-value="0.73" | 730 m || 
|-id=009 bgcolor=#E9E9E9
| 616009 ||  || — || February 2, 2005 || Kitt Peak || Spacewatch ||  || align=right data-sort-value="0.98" | 980 m || 
|-id=010 bgcolor=#d6d6d6
| 616010 ||  || — || February 8, 2005 || Mauna Kea || Mauna Kea Obs. ||  || align=right | 2.5 km || 
|-id=011 bgcolor=#d6d6d6
| 616011 ||  || — || February 1, 2005 || Kitt Peak || Spacewatch ||  || align=right | 2.4 km || 
|-id=012 bgcolor=#d6d6d6
| 616012 ||  || — || January 15, 2010 || Kitt Peak || Spacewatch ||  || align=right | 3.5 km || 
|-id=013 bgcolor=#d6d6d6
| 616013 ||  || — || February 24, 2006 || Kitt Peak || Spacewatch || 3:2 || align=right | 4.6 km || 
|-id=014 bgcolor=#E9E9E9
| 616014 ||  || — || February 15, 2005 || La Silla || A. Boattini ||  || align=right | 1.6 km || 
|-id=015 bgcolor=#d6d6d6
| 616015 ||  || — || September 1, 2013 || Haleakala || Pan-STARRS ||  || align=right | 2.1 km || 
|-id=016 bgcolor=#d6d6d6
| 616016 ||  || — || February 3, 2016 || Haleakala || Pan-STARRS ||  || align=right | 2.7 km || 
|-id=017 bgcolor=#E9E9E9
| 616017 ||  || — || January 7, 2017 || Mount Lemmon || Mount Lemmon Survey ||  || align=right data-sort-value="0.87" | 870 m || 
|-id=018 bgcolor=#d6d6d6
| 616018 ||  || — || February 9, 2005 || Mount Lemmon || Mount Lemmon Survey ||  || align=right | 2.8 km || 
|-id=019 bgcolor=#fefefe
| 616019 ||  || — || February 2, 2005 || Kitt Peak || Spacewatch ||  || align=right data-sort-value="0.67" | 670 m || 
|-id=020 bgcolor=#d6d6d6
| 616020 ||  || — || February 18, 2005 || La Silla || A. Boattini ||  || align=right | 2.8 km || 
|-id=021 bgcolor=#d6d6d6
| 616021 ||  || — || March 3, 2005 || Kitt Peak || Spacewatch ||  || align=right | 2.3 km || 
|-id=022 bgcolor=#E9E9E9
| 616022 ||  || — || March 4, 2005 || Mount Lemmon || Mount Lemmon Survey ||  || align=right data-sort-value="0.85" | 850 m || 
|-id=023 bgcolor=#d6d6d6
| 616023 ||  || — || March 4, 2005 || Mount Lemmon || Mount Lemmon Survey ||  || align=right | 1.9 km || 
|-id=024 bgcolor=#fefefe
| 616024 ||  || — || February 16, 2005 || La Silla || A. Boattini ||  || align=right data-sort-value="0.55" | 550 m || 
|-id=025 bgcolor=#E9E9E9
| 616025 ||  || — || November 17, 1995 || Kitt Peak || Spacewatch ||  || align=right | 1.0 km || 
|-id=026 bgcolor=#d6d6d6
| 616026 ||  || — || March 10, 2005 || Mount Lemmon || Mount Lemmon Survey ||  || align=right | 2.2 km || 
|-id=027 bgcolor=#d6d6d6
| 616027 ||  || — || March 10, 2005 || Mount Lemmon || Mount Lemmon Survey ||  || align=right | 2.5 km || 
|-id=028 bgcolor=#E9E9E9
| 616028 ||  || — || March 8, 2005 || Mount Lemmon || Mount Lemmon Survey ||  || align=right data-sort-value="0.83" | 830 m || 
|-id=029 bgcolor=#E9E9E9
| 616029 ||  || — || March 11, 2005 || Mount Lemmon || Mount Lemmon Survey ||  || align=right data-sort-value="0.76" | 760 m || 
|-id=030 bgcolor=#E9E9E9
| 616030 ||  || — || March 11, 2005 || Mount Lemmon || Mount Lemmon Survey ||  || align=right data-sort-value="0.80" | 800 m || 
|-id=031 bgcolor=#d6d6d6
| 616031 ||  || — || January 19, 2005 || Kitt Peak || Spacewatch ||  || align=right | 2.9 km || 
|-id=032 bgcolor=#d6d6d6
| 616032 ||  || — || March 12, 2005 || Kitt Peak || Spacewatch ||  || align=right | 2.7 km || 
|-id=033 bgcolor=#fefefe
| 616033 ||  || — || March 11, 2005 || Mount Lemmon || Mount Lemmon Survey ||  || align=right data-sort-value="0.66" | 660 m || 
|-id=034 bgcolor=#d6d6d6
| 616034 ||  || — || March 11, 2005 || Mount Lemmon || Mount Lemmon Survey ||  || align=right | 2.4 km || 
|-id=035 bgcolor=#d6d6d6
| 616035 ||  || — || March 11, 2005 || Mount Lemmon || Mount Lemmon Survey ||  || align=right | 2.8 km || 
|-id=036 bgcolor=#fefefe
| 616036 ||  || — || March 13, 2005 || Kitt Peak || Spacewatch ||  || align=right data-sort-value="0.87" | 870 m || 
|-id=037 bgcolor=#E9E9E9
| 616037 ||  || — || March 11, 2005 || Kitt Peak || M. W. Buie, L. H. Wasserman ||  || align=right data-sort-value="0.95" | 950 m || 
|-id=038 bgcolor=#d6d6d6
| 616038 ||  || — || March 4, 2005 || Mount Lemmon || Mount Lemmon Survey ||  || align=right | 2.4 km || 
|-id=039 bgcolor=#E9E9E9
| 616039 ||  || — || March 8, 2005 || Mount Lemmon || Mount Lemmon Survey ||  || align=right | 1.7 km || 
|-id=040 bgcolor=#d6d6d6
| 616040 ||  || — || March 10, 2005 || Mount Lemmon || Mount Lemmon Survey ||  || align=right | 2.6 km || 
|-id=041 bgcolor=#fefefe
| 616041 ||  || — || May 4, 2002 || Kitt Peak || Spacewatch ||  || align=right data-sort-value="0.51" | 510 m || 
|-id=042 bgcolor=#fefefe
| 616042 ||  || — || February 24, 2015 || Haleakala || Pan-STARRS ||  || align=right data-sort-value="0.56" | 560 m || 
|-id=043 bgcolor=#fefefe
| 616043 ||  || — || November 13, 2007 || Mount Lemmon || Mount Lemmon Survey ||  || align=right data-sort-value="0.62" | 620 m || 
|-id=044 bgcolor=#d6d6d6
| 616044 ||  || — || March 3, 2005 || Kitt Peak || Spacewatch ||  || align=right | 2.5 km || 
|-id=045 bgcolor=#d6d6d6
| 616045 ||  || — || September 11, 2007 || Mount Lemmon || Mount Lemmon Survey ||  || align=right | 2.6 km || 
|-id=046 bgcolor=#d6d6d6
| 616046 ||  || — || September 2, 2013 || Mount Lemmon || Mount Lemmon Survey ||  || align=right | 2.6 km || 
|-id=047 bgcolor=#d6d6d6
| 616047 ||  || — || October 3, 2013 || Haleakala || Pan-STARRS ||  || align=right | 2.1 km || 
|-id=048 bgcolor=#E9E9E9
| 616048 ||  || — || August 26, 1998 || Kitt Peak || Spacewatch ||  || align=right data-sort-value="0.84" | 840 m || 
|-id=049 bgcolor=#d6d6d6
| 616049 ||  || — || September 12, 2007 || Mount Lemmon || Mount Lemmon Survey ||  || align=right | 1.9 km || 
|-id=050 bgcolor=#d6d6d6
| 616050 ||  || — || December 11, 2014 || Mount Lemmon || Mount Lemmon Survey ||  || align=right | 2.7 km || 
|-id=051 bgcolor=#E9E9E9
| 616051 ||  || — || May 23, 2014 || Mount Lemmon || Mount Lemmon Survey ||  || align=right data-sort-value="0.79" | 790 m || 
|-id=052 bgcolor=#E9E9E9
| 616052 ||  || — || October 3, 2015 || Mount Lemmon || Mount Lemmon Survey ||  || align=right data-sort-value="0.82" | 820 m || 
|-id=053 bgcolor=#fefefe
| 616053 ||  || — || March 17, 2005 || Kitt Peak || Spacewatch || H || align=right data-sort-value="0.45" | 450 m || 
|-id=054 bgcolor=#d6d6d6
| 616054 ||  || — || April 6, 2011 || Mount Lemmon || Mount Lemmon Survey ||  || align=right | 2.3 km || 
|-id=055 bgcolor=#d6d6d6
| 616055 ||  || — || February 5, 2016 || Haleakala || Pan-STARRS ||  || align=right | 2.7 km || 
|-id=056 bgcolor=#d6d6d6
| 616056 ||  || — || March 9, 2005 || Mount Lemmon || Mount Lemmon Survey ||  || align=right | 2.2 km || 
|-id=057 bgcolor=#d6d6d6
| 616057 ||  || — || April 5, 2005 || Mount Lemmon || Mount Lemmon Survey ||  || align=right | 3.7 km || 
|-id=058 bgcolor=#fefefe
| 616058 ||  || — || November 29, 2003 || Kitt Peak || Spacewatch ||  || align=right data-sort-value="0.70" | 700 m || 
|-id=059 bgcolor=#fefefe
| 616059 ||  || — || March 14, 2005 || Mount Lemmon || Mount Lemmon Survey ||  || align=right data-sort-value="0.75" | 750 m || 
|-id=060 bgcolor=#d6d6d6
| 616060 ||  || — || February 2, 2005 || Kitt Peak || Spacewatch ||  || align=right | 2.9 km || 
|-id=061 bgcolor=#E9E9E9
| 616061 ||  || — || April 9, 2005 || Mount Lemmon || Mount Lemmon Survey ||  || align=right | 1.2 km || 
|-id=062 bgcolor=#E9E9E9
| 616062 ||  || — || April 10, 2005 || Mount Lemmon || Mount Lemmon Survey ||  || align=right data-sort-value="0.96" | 960 m || 
|-id=063 bgcolor=#d6d6d6
| 616063 ||  || — || April 6, 2005 || Mount Lemmon || Mount Lemmon Survey ||  || align=right | 2.6 km || 
|-id=064 bgcolor=#fefefe
| 616064 ||  || — || April 9, 2005 || Kitt Peak || Spacewatch ||  || align=right data-sort-value="0.65" | 650 m || 
|-id=065 bgcolor=#E9E9E9
| 616065 ||  || — || April 10, 2005 || Kitt Peak || Spacewatch ||  || align=right | 1.1 km || 
|-id=066 bgcolor=#d6d6d6
| 616066 ||  || — || April 10, 2005 || Kitt Peak || Spacewatch ||  || align=right | 2.5 km || 
|-id=067 bgcolor=#E9E9E9
| 616067 ||  || — || April 12, 2005 || Anderson Mesa || LONEOS ||  || align=right | 1.2 km || 
|-id=068 bgcolor=#E9E9E9
| 616068 ||  || — || April 11, 2005 || Kitt Peak || Spacewatch ||  || align=right | 1.3 km || 
|-id=069 bgcolor=#E9E9E9
| 616069 ||  || — || April 5, 2005 || Mount Lemmon || Mount Lemmon Survey ||  || align=right data-sort-value="0.91" | 910 m || 
|-id=070 bgcolor=#d6d6d6
| 616070 ||  || — || April 10, 2005 || Kitt Peak || Kitt Peak Obs. ||  || align=right | 2.6 km || 
|-id=071 bgcolor=#d6d6d6
| 616071 ||  || — || March 4, 2005 || Mount Lemmon || Mount Lemmon Survey ||  || align=right | 1.7 km || 
|-id=072 bgcolor=#fefefe
| 616072 ||  || — || April 5, 2005 || Mount Lemmon || Mount Lemmon Survey ||  || align=right data-sort-value="0.56" | 560 m || 
|-id=073 bgcolor=#d6d6d6
| 616073 ||  || — || March 10, 2005 || Mount Lemmon || Mount Lemmon Survey ||  || align=right | 1.9 km || 
|-id=074 bgcolor=#E9E9E9
| 616074 ||  || — || April 11, 2005 || Mount Lemmon || Mount Lemmon Survey ||  || align=right | 1.1 km || 
|-id=075 bgcolor=#fefefe
| 616075 ||  || — || April 4, 2005 || Mount Lemmon || Mount Lemmon Survey ||  || align=right data-sort-value="0.63" | 630 m || 
|-id=076 bgcolor=#fefefe
| 616076 ||  || — || May 25, 2015 || Haleakala || Pan-STARRS ||  || align=right data-sort-value="0.76" | 760 m || 
|-id=077 bgcolor=#d6d6d6
| 616077 ||  || — || October 3, 2013 || Haleakala || Pan-STARRS ||  || align=right | 2.5 km || 
|-id=078 bgcolor=#d6d6d6
| 616078 ||  || — || September 13, 2007 || Mount Lemmon || Mount Lemmon Survey ||  || align=right | 2.5 km || 
|-id=079 bgcolor=#d6d6d6
| 616079 ||  || — || November 21, 2014 || Haleakala || Pan-STARRS ||  || align=right | 2.3 km || 
|-id=080 bgcolor=#E9E9E9
| 616080 ||  || — || April 12, 2005 || Mount Lemmon || Mount Lemmon Survey ||  || align=right | 1.3 km || 
|-id=081 bgcolor=#E9E9E9
| 616081 ||  || — || November 4, 2007 || Kitt Peak || Spacewatch ||  || align=right | 1.3 km || 
|-id=082 bgcolor=#E9E9E9
| 616082 ||  || — || August 21, 2015 || Haleakala || Pan-STARRS ||  || align=right data-sort-value="0.75" | 750 m || 
|-id=083 bgcolor=#E9E9E9
| 616083 ||  || — || October 24, 2011 || Haleakala || Pan-STARRS ||  || align=right data-sort-value="0.90" | 900 m || 
|-id=084 bgcolor=#E9E9E9
| 616084 ||  || — || September 28, 2011 || Mount Lemmon || Mount Lemmon Survey ||  || align=right data-sort-value="0.69" | 690 m || 
|-id=085 bgcolor=#E9E9E9
| 616085 ||  || — || May 7, 2014 || Haleakala || Pan-STARRS ||  || align=right | 1.0 km || 
|-id=086 bgcolor=#E9E9E9
| 616086 ||  || — || February 14, 2017 || Haleakala || Pan-STARRS ||  || align=right data-sort-value="0.90" | 900 m || 
|-id=087 bgcolor=#E9E9E9
| 616087 ||  || — || March 5, 2013 || Kitt Peak || Spacewatch ||  || align=right data-sort-value="0.63" | 630 m || 
|-id=088 bgcolor=#E9E9E9
| 616088 ||  || — || February 20, 2018 || Haleakala || Pan-STARRS ||  || align=right | 1.7 km || 
|-id=089 bgcolor=#d6d6d6
| 616089 ||  || — || April 2, 2005 || Mount Lemmon || Mount Lemmon Survey ||  || align=right | 3.2 km || 
|-id=090 bgcolor=#d6d6d6
| 616090 ||  || — || October 23, 2001 || Socorro || LINEAR ||  || align=right | 2.8 km || 
|-id=091 bgcolor=#fefefe
| 616091 ||  || — || April 11, 2005 || Mount Lemmon || Mount Lemmon Survey ||  || align=right data-sort-value="0.70" | 700 m || 
|-id=092 bgcolor=#E9E9E9
| 616092 ||  || — || May 4, 2005 || Mount Lemmon || Mount Lemmon Survey ||  || align=right | 1.1 km || 
|-id=093 bgcolor=#E9E9E9
| 616093 ||  || — || May 4, 2005 || Mount Lemmon || Mount Lemmon Survey ||  || align=right | 1.3 km || 
|-id=094 bgcolor=#d6d6d6
| 616094 ||  || — || March 17, 2005 || Kitt Peak || Spacewatch ||  || align=right | 2.3 km || 
|-id=095 bgcolor=#E9E9E9
| 616095 ||  || — || May 7, 2005 || Mount Lemmon || Mount Lemmon Survey ||  || align=right | 1.6 km || 
|-id=096 bgcolor=#d6d6d6
| 616096 ||  || — || April 7, 2005 || Kitt Peak || Spacewatch ||  || align=right | 1.9 km || 
|-id=097 bgcolor=#fefefe
| 616097 ||  || — || April 16, 2005 || Kitt Peak || Spacewatch ||  || align=right data-sort-value="0.57" | 570 m || 
|-id=098 bgcolor=#E9E9E9
| 616098 ||  || — || May 9, 2005 || Mount Lemmon || Mount Lemmon Survey ||  || align=right | 1.2 km || 
|-id=099 bgcolor=#E9E9E9
| 616099 ||  || — || May 7, 2005 || Kitt Peak || Spacewatch ||  || align=right | 1.2 km || 
|-id=100 bgcolor=#d6d6d6
| 616100 ||  || — || May 8, 2005 || Kitt Peak || Spacewatch ||  || align=right | 2.7 km || 
|}

616101–616200 

|-bgcolor=#E9E9E9
| 616101 ||  || — || May 10, 2005 || Mount Lemmon || Mount Lemmon Survey ||  || align=right | 1.2 km || 
|-id=102 bgcolor=#d6d6d6
| 616102 ||  || — || May 10, 2005 || Mount Lemmon || Mount Lemmon Survey ||  || align=right | 2.9 km || 
|-id=103 bgcolor=#E9E9E9
| 616103 ||  || — || May 6, 2005 || Kitt Peak || Kitt Peak Obs. ||  || align=right | 2.4 km || 
|-id=104 bgcolor=#d6d6d6
| 616104 ||  || — || May 13, 2005 || Kitt Peak || Spacewatch ||  || align=right | 3.0 km || 
|-id=105 bgcolor=#d6d6d6
| 616105 ||  || — || May 13, 2005 || Kitt Peak || Spacewatch ||  || align=right | 2.2 km || 
|-id=106 bgcolor=#fefefe
| 616106 ||  || — || May 15, 2005 || Mount Lemmon || Mount Lemmon Survey ||  || align=right data-sort-value="0.64" | 640 m || 
|-id=107 bgcolor=#fefefe
| 616107 ||  || — || April 16, 2005 || Kitt Peak || Spacewatch ||  || align=right data-sort-value="0.65" | 650 m || 
|-id=108 bgcolor=#d6d6d6
| 616108 ||  || — || April 9, 2005 || Mount Lemmon || Mount Lemmon Survey ||  || align=right | 2.8 km || 
|-id=109 bgcolor=#d6d6d6
| 616109 ||  || — || April 4, 2005 || Catalina || CSS ||  || align=right | 3.2 km || 
|-id=110 bgcolor=#E9E9E9
| 616110 ||  || — || May 9, 2005 || Kitt Peak || Spacewatch ||  || align=right | 1.3 km || 
|-id=111 bgcolor=#d6d6d6
| 616111 ||  || — || May 9, 2005 || Kitt Peak || Spacewatch ||  || align=right | 2.7 km || 
|-id=112 bgcolor=#E9E9E9
| 616112 ||  || — || June 24, 2014 || Haleakala || Pan-STARRS ||  || align=right | 1.4 km || 
|-id=113 bgcolor=#fefefe
| 616113 ||  || — || March 11, 2008 || Mount Lemmon || Mount Lemmon Survey ||  || align=right data-sort-value="0.60" | 600 m || 
|-id=114 bgcolor=#fefefe
| 616114 ||  || — || May 3, 2005 || Kitt Peak || Spacewatch || H || align=right data-sort-value="0.50" | 500 m || 
|-id=115 bgcolor=#E9E9E9
| 616115 ||  || — || January 18, 2009 || Kitt Peak || Spacewatch ||  || align=right | 1.6 km || 
|-id=116 bgcolor=#d6d6d6
| 616116 ||  || — || November 21, 2014 || Haleakala || Pan-STARRS ||  || align=right | 3.3 km || 
|-id=117 bgcolor=#E9E9E9
| 616117 ||  || — || July 19, 2001 || Palomar || NEAT ||  || align=right | 1.3 km || 
|-id=118 bgcolor=#d6d6d6
| 616118 ||  || — || May 12, 2005 || Bergisch Gladbach || W. Bickel ||  || align=right | 3.5 km || 
|-id=119 bgcolor=#d6d6d6
| 616119 ||  || — || November 4, 2007 || Mount Lemmon || Mount Lemmon Survey ||  || align=right | 2.4 km || 
|-id=120 bgcolor=#d6d6d6
| 616120 ||  || — || October 16, 2007 || Kitt Peak || Spacewatch ||  || align=right | 3.1 km || 
|-id=121 bgcolor=#E9E9E9
| 616121 ||  || — || November 7, 2007 || Kitt Peak || Spacewatch ||  || align=right | 1.2 km || 
|-id=122 bgcolor=#d6d6d6
| 616122 ||  || — || April 3, 2016 || Haleakala || Pan-STARRS ||  || align=right | 2.3 km || 
|-id=123 bgcolor=#d6d6d6
| 616123 ||  || — || May 10, 2005 || Mount Lemmon || Mount Lemmon Survey ||  || align=right | 3.1 km || 
|-id=124 bgcolor=#d6d6d6
| 616124 ||  || — || November 9, 2013 || Kitt Peak || Spacewatch ||  || align=right | 2.8 km || 
|-id=125 bgcolor=#fefefe
| 616125 ||  || — || May 13, 2005 || Mount Lemmon || Mount Lemmon Survey ||  || align=right data-sort-value="0.68" | 680 m || 
|-id=126 bgcolor=#E9E9E9
| 616126 ||  || — || May 19, 2005 || Mount Lemmon || Mount Lemmon Survey ||  || align=right | 1.1 km || 
|-id=127 bgcolor=#fefefe
| 616127 ||  || — || February 25, 2012 || Mount Lemmon || Mount Lemmon Survey ||  || align=right data-sort-value="0.71" | 710 m || 
|-id=128 bgcolor=#fefefe
| 616128 ||  || — || May 19, 2005 || Mount Lemmon || Mount Lemmon Survey ||  || align=right data-sort-value="0.56" | 560 m || 
|-id=129 bgcolor=#fefefe
| 616129 ||  || — || April 14, 1994 || Kitt Peak || Spacewatch ||  || align=right data-sort-value="0.73" | 730 m || 
|-id=130 bgcolor=#E9E9E9
| 616130 ||  || — || January 15, 2013 || ESA OGS || ESA OGS ||  || align=right | 1.3 km || 
|-id=131 bgcolor=#E9E9E9
| 616131 ||  || — || June 1, 2005 || Kitt Peak || Spacewatch ||  || align=right | 1.6 km || 
|-id=132 bgcolor=#fefefe
| 616132 ||  || — || May 20, 2005 || Mount Lemmon || Mount Lemmon Survey ||  || align=right data-sort-value="0.53" | 530 m || 
|-id=133 bgcolor=#E9E9E9
| 616133 ||  || — || May 19, 2005 || Mount Lemmon || Mount Lemmon Survey ||  || align=right | 1.2 km || 
|-id=134 bgcolor=#E9E9E9
| 616134 ||  || — || May 15, 2005 || Mount Lemmon || Mount Lemmon Survey ||  || align=right | 1.3 km || 
|-id=135 bgcolor=#d6d6d6
| 616135 ||  || — || February 16, 2004 || Kitt Peak || Spacewatch ||  || align=right | 3.7 km || 
|-id=136 bgcolor=#fefefe
| 616136 ||  || — || June 13, 2005 || Mount Lemmon || Mount Lemmon Survey ||  || align=right data-sort-value="0.49" | 490 m || 
|-id=137 bgcolor=#E9E9E9
| 616137 ||  || — || October 19, 2015 || Haleakala || Pan-STARRS ||  || align=right | 1.6 km || 
|-id=138 bgcolor=#fefefe
| 616138 ||  || — || June 17, 2005 || Mount Lemmon || Mount Lemmon Survey ||  || align=right data-sort-value="0.73" | 730 m || 
|-id=139 bgcolor=#E9E9E9
| 616139 ||  || — || June 24, 2005 || Palomar || NEAT ||  || align=right | 1.8 km || 
|-id=140 bgcolor=#fefefe
| 616140 ||  || — || September 12, 2002 || Palomar || NEAT ||  || align=right data-sort-value="0.73" | 730 m || 
|-id=141 bgcolor=#FA8072
| 616141 ||  || — || June 28, 2005 || Palomar || NEAT ||  || align=right data-sort-value="0.62" | 620 m || 
|-id=142 bgcolor=#fefefe
| 616142 ||  || — || June 29, 2005 || Kitt Peak || Spacewatch ||  || align=right data-sort-value="0.56" | 560 m || 
|-id=143 bgcolor=#E9E9E9
| 616143 ||  || — || June 29, 2005 || Kitt Peak || Spacewatch ||  || align=right | 1.8 km || 
|-id=144 bgcolor=#fefefe
| 616144 ||  || — || June 24, 1995 || Kitt Peak || Spacewatch ||  || align=right data-sort-value="0.66" | 660 m || 
|-id=145 bgcolor=#E9E9E9
| 616145 ||  || — || June 13, 2005 || Kitt Peak || Spacewatch ||  || align=right | 1.5 km || 
|-id=146 bgcolor=#E9E9E9
| 616146 ||  || — || November 24, 2011 || Mount Lemmon || Mount Lemmon Survey ||  || align=right | 1.6 km || 
|-id=147 bgcolor=#E9E9E9
| 616147 ||  || — || July 1, 2005 || Palomar || NEAT ||  || align=right | 2.2 km || 
|-id=148 bgcolor=#fefefe
| 616148 ||  || — || July 5, 2005 || Kitt Peak || Spacewatch ||  || align=right data-sort-value="0.56" | 560 m || 
|-id=149 bgcolor=#E9E9E9
| 616149 ||  || — || July 5, 2005 || Kitt Peak || Spacewatch ||  || align=right | 1.6 km || 
|-id=150 bgcolor=#FA8072
| 616150 ||  || — || July 5, 2005 || Siding Spring || SSS ||  || align=right data-sort-value="0.71" | 710 m || 
|-id=151 bgcolor=#fefefe
| 616151 ||  || — || July 6, 2005 || Kitt Peak || Spacewatch ||  || align=right data-sort-value="0.59" | 590 m || 
|-id=152 bgcolor=#E9E9E9
| 616152 ||  || — || July 5, 2005 || Kitt Peak || Spacewatch ||  || align=right | 2.1 km || 
|-id=153 bgcolor=#fefefe
| 616153 ||  || — || July 2, 2005 || Kitt Peak || Spacewatch ||  || align=right data-sort-value="0.63" | 630 m || 
|-id=154 bgcolor=#fefefe
| 616154 ||  || — || July 10, 2005 || Kitt Peak || Spacewatch ||  || align=right data-sort-value="0.64" | 640 m || 
|-id=155 bgcolor=#fefefe
| 616155 ||  || — || June 21, 2005 || Palomar || NEAT ||  || align=right data-sort-value="0.75" | 750 m || 
|-id=156 bgcolor=#fefefe
| 616156 ||  || — || June 17, 2005 || Mount Lemmon || Mount Lemmon Survey ||  || align=right data-sort-value="0.49" | 490 m || 
|-id=157 bgcolor=#E9E9E9
| 616157 ||  || — || June 13, 2005 || Mount Lemmon || Mount Lemmon Survey ||  || align=right | 1.3 km || 
|-id=158 bgcolor=#fefefe
| 616158 ||  || — || June 17, 2005 || Mount Lemmon || Mount Lemmon Survey ||  || align=right data-sort-value="0.67" | 670 m || 
|-id=159 bgcolor=#E9E9E9
| 616159 ||  || — || July 7, 2005 || Mauna Kea || Mauna Kea Obs. ||  || align=right | 1.6 km || 
|-id=160 bgcolor=#fefefe
| 616160 ||  || — || July 7, 2005 || Mauna Kea || Mauna Kea Obs. ||  || align=right data-sort-value="0.60" | 600 m || 
|-id=161 bgcolor=#E9E9E9
| 616161 ||  || — || July 7, 2005 || Mauna Kea || Mauna Kea Obs. ||  || align=right | 1.6 km || 
|-id=162 bgcolor=#E9E9E9
| 616162 ||  || — || February 9, 2008 || Kitt Peak || Spacewatch ||  || align=right | 1.4 km || 
|-id=163 bgcolor=#E9E9E9
| 616163 ||  || — || April 6, 2005 || Kitt Peak || Spacewatch ||  || align=right | 1.5 km || 
|-id=164 bgcolor=#fefefe
| 616164 ||  || — || July 11, 2005 || Kitt Peak || Spacewatch ||  || align=right data-sort-value="0.78" | 780 m || 
|-id=165 bgcolor=#fefefe
| 616165 ||  || — || March 28, 2015 || Haleakala || Pan-STARRS ||  || align=right data-sort-value="0.67" | 670 m || 
|-id=166 bgcolor=#E9E9E9
| 616166 ||  || — || July 15, 2005 || Kitt Peak || Spacewatch ||  || align=right | 1.3 km || 
|-id=167 bgcolor=#fefefe
| 616167 ||  || — || July 3, 2005 || Palomar || NEAT ||  || align=right data-sort-value="0.62" | 620 m || 
|-id=168 bgcolor=#E9E9E9
| 616168 ||  || — || July 29, 2005 || Palomar || NEAT ||  || align=right | 1.8 km || 
|-id=169 bgcolor=#fefefe
| 616169 ||  || — || July 30, 2005 || Palomar || NEAT ||  || align=right data-sort-value="0.89" | 890 m || 
|-id=170 bgcolor=#E9E9E9
| 616170 ||  || — || July 12, 2005 || Mount Lemmon || Mount Lemmon Survey ||  || align=right | 2.2 km || 
|-id=171 bgcolor=#E9E9E9
| 616171 ||  || — || July 27, 2005 || Palomar || NEAT ||  || align=right | 3.2 km || 
|-id=172 bgcolor=#fefefe
| 616172 ||  || — || July 30, 2005 || Palomar || NEAT ||  || align=right data-sort-value="0.56" | 560 m || 
|-id=173 bgcolor=#fefefe
| 616173 ||  || — || February 6, 2014 || Mount Lemmon || Mount Lemmon Survey ||  || align=right data-sort-value="0.69" | 690 m || 
|-id=174 bgcolor=#fefefe
| 616174 ||  || — || August 10, 2016 || Haleakala || Pan-STARRS ||  || align=right data-sort-value="0.59" | 590 m || 
|-id=175 bgcolor=#fefefe
| 616175 ||  || — || July 28, 2005 || Palomar || NEAT ||  || align=right data-sort-value="0.53" | 530 m || 
|-id=176 bgcolor=#fefefe
| 616176 ||  || — || July 30, 2005 || Palomar || NEAT ||  || align=right data-sort-value="0.68" | 680 m || 
|-id=177 bgcolor=#d6d6d6
| 616177 ||  || — || July 30, 2005 || Palomar || NEAT ||  || align=right | 2.8 km || 
|-id=178 bgcolor=#d6d6d6
| 616178 ||  || — || July 30, 2005 || Palomar || NEAT || Tj (2.99) || align=right | 2.2 km || 
|-id=179 bgcolor=#FA8072
| 616179 ||  || — || August 1, 2005 || Siding Spring || SSS ||  || align=right data-sort-value="0.68" | 680 m || 
|-id=180 bgcolor=#fefefe
| 616180 ||  || — || August 4, 2005 || Palomar || NEAT ||  || align=right data-sort-value="0.87" | 870 m || 
|-id=181 bgcolor=#fefefe
| 616181 ||  || — || August 4, 2005 || Palomar || NEAT ||  || align=right data-sort-value="0.83" | 830 m || 
|-id=182 bgcolor=#fefefe
| 616182 ||  || — || August 4, 2005 || Palomar || NEAT ||  || align=right data-sort-value="0.96" | 960 m || 
|-id=183 bgcolor=#fefefe
| 616183 ||  || — || July 31, 2005 || Palomar || NEAT ||  || align=right data-sort-value="0.66" | 660 m || 
|-id=184 bgcolor=#fefefe
| 616184 ||  || — || February 1, 1997 || Kitt Peak || Spacewatch ||  || align=right data-sort-value="0.72" | 720 m || 
|-id=185 bgcolor=#fefefe
| 616185 ||  || — || August 17, 2012 || Haleakala || Pan-STARRS ||  || align=right data-sort-value="0.58" | 580 m || 
|-id=186 bgcolor=#fefefe
| 616186 ||  || — || August 4, 2005 || Palomar || NEAT ||  || align=right data-sort-value="0.79" | 790 m || 
|-id=187 bgcolor=#fefefe
| 616187 ||  || — || August 24, 2005 || Palomar || NEAT || H || align=right data-sort-value="0.76" | 760 m || 
|-id=188 bgcolor=#fefefe
| 616188 ||  || — || August 6, 2005 || Palomar || NEAT ||  || align=right data-sort-value="0.81" | 810 m || 
|-id=189 bgcolor=#fefefe
| 616189 ||  || — || August 25, 2005 || Palomar || NEAT ||  || align=right data-sort-value="0.71" | 710 m || 
|-id=190 bgcolor=#fefefe
| 616190 ||  || — || August 25, 2005 || Palomar || NEAT ||  || align=right data-sort-value="0.81" | 810 m || 
|-id=191 bgcolor=#fefefe
| 616191 ||  || — || August 26, 2005 || Anderson Mesa || LONEOS ||  || align=right data-sort-value="0.88" | 880 m || 
|-id=192 bgcolor=#E9E9E9
| 616192 ||  || — || August 26, 2005 || Campo Imperatore || CINEOS ||  || align=right | 1.9 km || 
|-id=193 bgcolor=#fefefe
| 616193 ||  || — || August 29, 2005 || Anderson Mesa || LONEOS ||  || align=right data-sort-value="0.88" | 880 m || 
|-id=194 bgcolor=#E9E9E9
| 616194 ||  || — || August 28, 2005 || Kitt Peak || Spacewatch ||  || align=right | 2.2 km || 
|-id=195 bgcolor=#fefefe
| 616195 ||  || — || July 31, 2005 || Palomar || NEAT ||  || align=right data-sort-value="0.84" | 840 m || 
|-id=196 bgcolor=#fefefe
| 616196 ||  || — || August 27, 2005 || Anderson Mesa || LONEOS ||  || align=right data-sort-value="0.67" | 670 m || 
|-id=197 bgcolor=#fefefe
| 616197 ||  || — || August 27, 2005 || Anderson Mesa || LONEOS ||  || align=right data-sort-value="0.85" | 850 m || 
|-id=198 bgcolor=#E9E9E9
| 616198 ||  || — || August 6, 2005 || Palomar || NEAT ||  || align=right | 1.4 km || 
|-id=199 bgcolor=#fefefe
| 616199 ||  || — || August 25, 2005 || Palomar || NEAT ||  || align=right data-sort-value="0.92" | 920 m || 
|-id=200 bgcolor=#fefefe
| 616200 ||  || — || August 26, 2005 || Palomar || NEAT ||  || align=right data-sort-value="0.73" | 730 m || 
|}

616201–616300 

|-bgcolor=#fefefe
| 616201 ||  || — || August 26, 2005 || Palomar || NEAT ||  || align=right data-sort-value="0.65" | 650 m || 
|-id=202 bgcolor=#E9E9E9
| 616202 ||  || — || July 29, 2005 || Palomar || NEAT ||  || align=right | 2.5 km || 
|-id=203 bgcolor=#fefefe
| 616203 ||  || — || August 26, 2005 || Anderson Mesa || LONEOS ||  || align=right data-sort-value="0.78" | 780 m || 
|-id=204 bgcolor=#E9E9E9
| 616204 ||  || — || August 29, 2005 || Kitt Peak || Spacewatch ||  || align=right | 2.3 km || 
|-id=205 bgcolor=#fefefe
| 616205 ||  || — || August 29, 2005 || Anderson Mesa || LONEOS ||  || align=right data-sort-value="0.79" | 790 m || 
|-id=206 bgcolor=#fefefe
| 616206 ||  || — || August 25, 2005 || Palomar || NEAT ||  || align=right data-sort-value="0.90" | 900 m || 
|-id=207 bgcolor=#fefefe
| 616207 ||  || — || August 25, 2005 || Palomar || NEAT ||  || align=right data-sort-value="0.75" | 750 m || 
|-id=208 bgcolor=#fefefe
| 616208 ||  || — || August 25, 2005 || Palomar || NEAT ||  || align=right data-sort-value="0.73" | 730 m || 
|-id=209 bgcolor=#fefefe
| 616209 ||  || — || August 5, 2005 || Palomar || NEAT ||  || align=right data-sort-value="0.68" | 680 m || 
|-id=210 bgcolor=#E9E9E9
| 616210 ||  || — || August 6, 2005 || Palomar || NEAT ||  || align=right | 2.2 km || 
|-id=211 bgcolor=#E9E9E9
| 616211 ||  || — || August 31, 2005 || Kitt Peak || Spacewatch ||  || align=right | 1.9 km || 
|-id=212 bgcolor=#E9E9E9
| 616212 ||  || — || July 31, 2005 || Palomar || NEAT ||  || align=right | 1.8 km || 
|-id=213 bgcolor=#fefefe
| 616213 ||  || — || August 30, 2005 || Kitt Peak || Spacewatch ||  || align=right data-sort-value="0.60" | 600 m || 
|-id=214 bgcolor=#fefefe
| 616214 ||  || — || August 30, 2005 || Kitt Peak || Spacewatch ||  || align=right data-sort-value="0.66" | 660 m || 
|-id=215 bgcolor=#fefefe
| 616215 ||  || — || August 31, 2005 || Kitt Peak || Spacewatch ||  || align=right data-sort-value="0.63" | 630 m || 
|-id=216 bgcolor=#E9E9E9
| 616216 ||  || — || August 28, 2005 || Kitt Peak || Spacewatch ||  || align=right | 1.7 km || 
|-id=217 bgcolor=#fefefe
| 616217 ||  || — || August 28, 2005 || Kitt Peak || Spacewatch ||  || align=right data-sort-value="0.48" | 480 m || 
|-id=218 bgcolor=#fefefe
| 616218 ||  || — || August 28, 2005 || Kitt Peak || Spacewatch ||  || align=right data-sort-value="0.60" | 600 m || 
|-id=219 bgcolor=#fefefe
| 616219 ||  || — || August 28, 2005 || Kitt Peak || Spacewatch ||  || align=right data-sort-value="0.64" | 640 m || 
|-id=220 bgcolor=#fefefe
| 616220 ||  || — || August 28, 2005 || Kitt Peak || Spacewatch ||  || align=right data-sort-value="0.67" | 670 m || 
|-id=221 bgcolor=#fefefe
| 616221 ||  || — || August 28, 2005 || CAO, San Pedro de ||  ||  || align=right | 1.1 km || 
|-id=222 bgcolor=#E9E9E9
| 616222 ||  || — || August 28, 2005 || Siding Spring || SSS ||  || align=right | 2.3 km || 
|-id=223 bgcolor=#fefefe
| 616223 ||  || — || August 28, 2005 || Kitt Peak || Spacewatch ||  || align=right data-sort-value="0.58" | 580 m || 
|-id=224 bgcolor=#fefefe
| 616224 ||  || — || August 30, 2005 || Palomar || NEAT ||  || align=right data-sort-value="0.67" | 670 m || 
|-id=225 bgcolor=#fefefe
| 616225 ||  || — || January 1, 2003 || Kitt Peak || Spacewatch ||  || align=right data-sort-value="0.86" | 860 m || 
|-id=226 bgcolor=#E9E9E9
| 616226 ||  || — || August 5, 2005 || Palomar || NEAT ||  || align=right | 1.7 km || 
|-id=227 bgcolor=#E9E9E9
| 616227 ||  || — || August 31, 2005 || Kitt Peak || Spacewatch ||  || align=right data-sort-value="0.86" | 860 m || 
|-id=228 bgcolor=#fefefe
| 616228 ||  || — || August 31, 2005 || Kitt Peak || Spacewatch ||  || align=right data-sort-value="0.68" | 680 m || 
|-id=229 bgcolor=#E9E9E9
| 616229 ||  || — || August 31, 2005 || Palomar || NEAT ||  || align=right | 1.9 km || 
|-id=230 bgcolor=#fefefe
| 616230 ||  || — || August 31, 2005 || Kitt Peak || Spacewatch ||  || align=right data-sort-value="0.48" | 480 m || 
|-id=231 bgcolor=#d6d6d6
| 616231 ||  || — || August 29, 2005 || Anderson Mesa || LONEOS ||  || align=right | 2.2 km || 
|-id=232 bgcolor=#E9E9E9
| 616232 ||  || — || February 10, 1999 || Kitt Peak || Spacewatch ||  || align=right | 1.0 km || 
|-id=233 bgcolor=#d6d6d6
| 616233 ||  || — || December 20, 2007 || Kitt Peak || Spacewatch ||  || align=right | 2.4 km || 
|-id=234 bgcolor=#d6d6d6
| 616234 ||  || — || May 26, 2015 || Haleakala || Pan-STARRS ||  || align=right | 3.1 km || 
|-id=235 bgcolor=#fefefe
| 616235 ||  || — || August 31, 2005 || Kitt Peak || Spacewatch ||  || align=right data-sort-value="0.66" | 660 m || 
|-id=236 bgcolor=#fefefe
| 616236 ||  || — || August 27, 2005 || Palomar || NEAT ||  || align=right data-sort-value="0.69" | 690 m || 
|-id=237 bgcolor=#fefefe
| 616237 ||  || — || August 27, 2005 || Palomar || NEAT ||  || align=right data-sort-value="0.43" | 430 m || 
|-id=238 bgcolor=#d6d6d6
| 616238 ||  || — || August 28, 2005 || Kitt Peak || Spacewatch ||  || align=right | 2.1 km || 
|-id=239 bgcolor=#fefefe
| 616239 ||  || — || September 1, 2005 || St. Veran || Saint-Véran Obs. ||  || align=right data-sort-value="0.57" | 570 m || 
|-id=240 bgcolor=#fefefe
| 616240 ||  || — || August 25, 2005 || Palomar || NEAT ||  || align=right data-sort-value="0.81" | 810 m || 
|-id=241 bgcolor=#fefefe
| 616241 ||  || — || August 31, 2005 || Palomar || NEAT ||  || align=right data-sort-value="0.89" | 890 m || 
|-id=242 bgcolor=#E9E9E9
| 616242 ||  || — || September 1, 2005 || Kitt Peak || Spacewatch ||  || align=right | 1.7 km || 
|-id=243 bgcolor=#fefefe
| 616243 ||  || — || August 26, 2005 || Palomar || NEAT ||  || align=right data-sort-value="0.87" | 870 m || 
|-id=244 bgcolor=#fefefe
| 616244 ||  || — || September 1, 2005 || Kitt Peak || Spacewatch ||  || align=right data-sort-value="0.64" | 640 m || 
|-id=245 bgcolor=#fefefe
| 616245 ||  || — || September 1, 2005 || Palomar || NEAT ||  || align=right | 1.0 km || 
|-id=246 bgcolor=#fefefe
| 616246 ||  || — || July 31, 2005 || Palomar || NEAT ||  || align=right data-sort-value="0.54" | 540 m || 
|-id=247 bgcolor=#E9E9E9
| 616247 ||  || — || September 3, 2005 || Palomar || NEAT ||  || align=right | 2.3 km || 
|-id=248 bgcolor=#E9E9E9
| 616248 ||  || — || October 1, 2005 || Apache Point || SDSS Collaboration ||  || align=right | 1.5 km || 
|-id=249 bgcolor=#fefefe
| 616249 ||  || — || September 1, 2005 || Kitt Peak || Spacewatch ||  || align=right data-sort-value="0.73" | 730 m || 
|-id=250 bgcolor=#E9E9E9
| 616250 ||  || — || January 31, 2012 || Mount Lemmon || Mount Lemmon Survey ||  || align=right | 2.3 km || 
|-id=251 bgcolor=#E9E9E9
| 616251 ||  || — || September 14, 2005 || Kitt Peak || Spacewatch ||  || align=right | 1.8 km || 
|-id=252 bgcolor=#fefefe
| 616252 ||  || — || March 14, 2011 || Mount Lemmon || Mount Lemmon Survey ||  || align=right data-sort-value="0.74" | 740 m || 
|-id=253 bgcolor=#fefefe
| 616253 ||  || — || September 13, 2005 || Kitt Peak || Spacewatch ||  || align=right data-sort-value="0.51" | 510 m || 
|-id=254 bgcolor=#E9E9E9
| 616254 ||  || — || October 11, 2010 || Mount Lemmon || Mount Lemmon Survey ||  || align=right | 2.0 km || 
|-id=255 bgcolor=#d6d6d6
| 616255 ||  || — || September 12, 2005 || Kitt Peak || Spacewatch || 7:4 || align=right | 3.0 km || 
|-id=256 bgcolor=#E9E9E9
| 616256 ||  || — || January 18, 2012 || Mount Lemmon || Mount Lemmon Survey ||  || align=right | 1.8 km || 
|-id=257 bgcolor=#E9E9E9
| 616257 ||  || — || August 3, 2014 || Haleakala || Pan-STARRS ||  || align=right | 1.5 km || 
|-id=258 bgcolor=#d6d6d6
| 616258 ||  || — || September 14, 2005 || Kitt Peak || Spacewatch ||  || align=right | 2.1 km || 
|-id=259 bgcolor=#fefefe
| 616259 ||  || — || August 31, 2005 || Kitt Peak || Spacewatch ||  || align=right data-sort-value="0.71" | 710 m || 
|-id=260 bgcolor=#fefefe
| 616260 ||  || — || September 23, 2005 || Kitt Peak || Spacewatch ||  || align=right data-sort-value="0.68" | 680 m || 
|-id=261 bgcolor=#fefefe
| 616261 ||  || — || September 26, 2005 || Kitt Peak || Spacewatch ||  || align=right data-sort-value="0.59" | 590 m || 
|-id=262 bgcolor=#fefefe
| 616262 ||  || — || September 23, 2005 || Catalina || CSS ||  || align=right data-sort-value="0.90" | 900 m || 
|-id=263 bgcolor=#d6d6d6
| 616263 ||  || — || September 22, 2005 || Palomar || NEAT || Tj (2.99) || align=right | 3.1 km || 
|-id=264 bgcolor=#E9E9E9
| 616264 ||  || — || September 24, 2005 || Kitt Peak || Spacewatch ||  || align=right | 2.1 km || 
|-id=265 bgcolor=#fefefe
| 616265 ||  || — || September 24, 2005 || Kitt Peak || Spacewatch ||  || align=right data-sort-value="0.57" | 570 m || 
|-id=266 bgcolor=#E9E9E9
| 616266 ||  || — || September 23, 2005 || Catalina || CSS ||  || align=right | 2.6 km || 
|-id=267 bgcolor=#fefefe
| 616267 ||  || — || September 24, 2005 || Kitt Peak || Spacewatch ||  || align=right data-sort-value="0.59" | 590 m || 
|-id=268 bgcolor=#fefefe
| 616268 ||  || — || September 25, 2005 || Kitt Peak || Spacewatch || H || align=right data-sort-value="0.69" | 690 m || 
|-id=269 bgcolor=#fefefe
| 616269 ||  || — || September 26, 2005 || Kitt Peak || Spacewatch ||  || align=right data-sort-value="0.58" | 580 m || 
|-id=270 bgcolor=#fefefe
| 616270 ||  || — || August 25, 2005 || Palomar || NEAT ||  || align=right data-sort-value="0.64" | 640 m || 
|-id=271 bgcolor=#E9E9E9
| 616271 ||  || — || September 27, 2005 || Kitt Peak || Spacewatch ||  || align=right | 1.8 km || 
|-id=272 bgcolor=#E9E9E9
| 616272 ||  || — || August 31, 2005 || Palomar || NEAT ||  || align=right | 2.3 km || 
|-id=273 bgcolor=#fefefe
| 616273 ||  || — || July 4, 2005 || Mount Lemmon || Mount Lemmon Survey ||  || align=right data-sort-value="0.60" | 600 m || 
|-id=274 bgcolor=#E9E9E9
| 616274 ||  || — || September 23, 2005 || Catalina || CSS ||  || align=right | 2.3 km || 
|-id=275 bgcolor=#fefefe
| 616275 ||  || — || September 23, 2005 || Catalina || CSS ||  || align=right data-sort-value="0.61" | 610 m || 
|-id=276 bgcolor=#E9E9E9
| 616276 ||  || — || September 24, 2005 || Kitt Peak || Spacewatch ||  || align=right | 1.6 km || 
|-id=277 bgcolor=#E9E9E9
| 616277 ||  || — || September 24, 2005 || Kitt Peak || Spacewatch ||  || align=right | 2.0 km || 
|-id=278 bgcolor=#fefefe
| 616278 ||  || — || September 25, 2005 || Kitt Peak || Spacewatch ||  || align=right data-sort-value="0.82" | 820 m || 
|-id=279 bgcolor=#d6d6d6
| 616279 ||  || — || August 31, 2005 || Palomar || NEAT ||  || align=right | 2.8 km || 
|-id=280 bgcolor=#E9E9E9
| 616280 ||  || — || December 4, 1996 || Kitt Peak || Spacewatch ||  || align=right | 2.1 km || 
|-id=281 bgcolor=#fefefe
| 616281 ||  || — || August 29, 2005 || Kitt Peak || Spacewatch ||  || align=right data-sort-value="0.60" | 600 m || 
|-id=282 bgcolor=#d6d6d6
| 616282 ||  || — || September 26, 2005 || Kitt Peak || Spacewatch ||  || align=right | 1.7 km || 
|-id=283 bgcolor=#fefefe
| 616283 ||  || — || September 26, 2005 || Kitt Peak || Spacewatch ||  || align=right data-sort-value="0.72" | 720 m || 
|-id=284 bgcolor=#fefefe
| 616284 ||  || — || September 26, 2005 || Palomar || NEAT ||  || align=right data-sort-value="0.84" | 840 m || 
|-id=285 bgcolor=#fefefe
| 616285 ||  || — || September 27, 2005 || Kitt Peak || Spacewatch ||  || align=right data-sort-value="0.61" | 610 m || 
|-id=286 bgcolor=#E9E9E9
| 616286 ||  || — || September 27, 2005 || Kitt Peak || Spacewatch ||  || align=right | 1.9 km || 
|-id=287 bgcolor=#E9E9E9
| 616287 ||  || — || September 29, 2005 || Anderson Mesa || LONEOS ||  || align=right | 2.3 km || 
|-id=288 bgcolor=#fefefe
| 616288 ||  || — || September 29, 2005 || Mount Lemmon || Mount Lemmon Survey ||  || align=right data-sort-value="0.65" | 650 m || 
|-id=289 bgcolor=#FA8072
| 616289 ||  || — || August 30, 2005 || Palomar || NEAT ||  || align=right data-sort-value="0.97" | 970 m || 
|-id=290 bgcolor=#fefefe
| 616290 ||  || — || September 25, 2005 || Kitt Peak || Spacewatch ||  || align=right | 1.0 km || 
|-id=291 bgcolor=#FA8072
| 616291 ||  || — || September 27, 2005 || Palomar || NEAT ||  || align=right data-sort-value="0.77" | 770 m || 
|-id=292 bgcolor=#FA8072
| 616292 ||  || — || August 31, 2005 || Palomar || NEAT ||  || align=right data-sort-value="0.69" | 690 m || 
|-id=293 bgcolor=#fefefe
| 616293 ||  || — || September 29, 2005 || Kitt Peak || Spacewatch ||  || align=right data-sort-value="0.53" | 530 m || 
|-id=294 bgcolor=#E9E9E9
| 616294 ||  || — || September 29, 2005 || Kitt Peak || Spacewatch ||  || align=right | 1.6 km || 
|-id=295 bgcolor=#E9E9E9
| 616295 ||  || — || September 29, 2005 || Kitt Peak || Spacewatch ||  || align=right | 1.8 km || 
|-id=296 bgcolor=#E9E9E9
| 616296 ||  || — || September 29, 2005 || Kitt Peak || Spacewatch ||  || align=right | 1.8 km || 
|-id=297 bgcolor=#E9E9E9
| 616297 ||  || — || September 29, 2005 || Palomar || NEAT ||  || align=right | 3.0 km || 
|-id=298 bgcolor=#fefefe
| 616298 ||  || — || August 30, 2005 || Palomar || NEAT ||  || align=right data-sort-value="0.68" | 680 m || 
|-id=299 bgcolor=#fefefe
| 616299 ||  || — || September 29, 2005 || Mount Lemmon || Mount Lemmon Survey ||  || align=right data-sort-value="0.64" | 640 m || 
|-id=300 bgcolor=#E9E9E9
| 616300 ||  || — || August 27, 2005 || Palomar || NEAT ||  || align=right data-sort-value="0.97" | 970 m || 
|}

616301–616400 

|-bgcolor=#fefefe
| 616301 ||  || — || September 14, 2005 || Kitt Peak || Spacewatch ||  || align=right data-sort-value="0.66" | 660 m || 
|-id=302 bgcolor=#fefefe
| 616302 ||  || — || August 31, 2005 || Palomar || NEAT ||  || align=right data-sort-value="0.67" | 670 m || 
|-id=303 bgcolor=#fefefe
| 616303 ||  || — || August 31, 2005 || Palomar || NEAT ||  || align=right data-sort-value="0.85" | 850 m || 
|-id=304 bgcolor=#fefefe
| 616304 ||  || — || September 29, 2005 || Mount Lemmon || Mount Lemmon Survey ||  || align=right data-sort-value="0.62" | 620 m || 
|-id=305 bgcolor=#fefefe
| 616305 ||  || — || September 29, 2005 || Kitt Peak || Spacewatch ||  || align=right data-sort-value="0.61" | 610 m || 
|-id=306 bgcolor=#fefefe
| 616306 ||  || — || August 31, 2005 || Kitt Peak || Spacewatch ||  || align=right data-sort-value="0.51" | 510 m || 
|-id=307 bgcolor=#fefefe
| 616307 ||  || — || September 24, 2005 || Kitt Peak || Spacewatch ||  || align=right data-sort-value="0.69" | 690 m || 
|-id=308 bgcolor=#fefefe
| 616308 ||  || — || September 30, 2005 || Anderson Mesa || LONEOS ||  || align=right data-sort-value="0.65" | 650 m || 
|-id=309 bgcolor=#fefefe
| 616309 ||  || — || September 30, 2005 || Anderson Mesa || LONEOS ||  || align=right data-sort-value="0.77" | 770 m || 
|-id=310 bgcolor=#E9E9E9
| 616310 ||  || — || September 29, 2005 || Kitt Peak || Spacewatch ||  || align=right | 1.7 km || 
|-id=311 bgcolor=#E9E9E9
| 616311 ||  || — || September 25, 2005 || Palomar || NEAT ||  || align=right | 1.9 km || 
|-id=312 bgcolor=#E9E9E9
| 616312 ||  || — || November 3, 2005 || Catalina || CSS ||  || align=right | 2.3 km || 
|-id=313 bgcolor=#E9E9E9
| 616313 ||  || — || October 1, 2005 || Apache Point || SDSS Collaboration ||  || align=right | 1.9 km || 
|-id=314 bgcolor=#fefefe
| 616314 ||  || — || September 29, 2005 || Mount Lemmon || Mount Lemmon Survey ||  || align=right data-sort-value="0.59" | 590 m || 
|-id=315 bgcolor=#E9E9E9
| 616315 ||  || — || August 27, 2005 || Palomar || NEAT ||  || align=right | 2.4 km || 
|-id=316 bgcolor=#E9E9E9
| 616316 ||  || — || September 29, 2005 || Mount Lemmon || Mount Lemmon Survey ||  || align=right | 1.7 km || 
|-id=317 bgcolor=#d6d6d6
| 616317 ||  || — || November 11, 2010 || Kitt Peak || Spacewatch ||  || align=right | 1.9 km || 
|-id=318 bgcolor=#fefefe
| 616318 ||  || — || August 24, 2012 || Catalina || CSS ||  || align=right data-sort-value="0.55" | 550 m || 
|-id=319 bgcolor=#fefefe
| 616319 ||  || — || September 29, 2005 || Kitt Peak || Spacewatch ||  || align=right data-sort-value="0.43" | 430 m || 
|-id=320 bgcolor=#FA8072
| 616320 ||  || — || September 1, 2005 || Socorro || LINEAR ||  || align=right data-sort-value="0.60" | 600 m || 
|-id=321 bgcolor=#fefefe
| 616321 ||  || — || October 1, 2005 || Kitt Peak || Spacewatch ||  || align=right data-sort-value="0.61" | 610 m || 
|-id=322 bgcolor=#fefefe
| 616322 ||  || — || October 1, 2005 || Kitt Peak || Spacewatch ||  || align=right data-sort-value="0.67" | 670 m || 
|-id=323 bgcolor=#fefefe
| 616323 ||  || — || October 2, 2005 || Mount Lemmon || Mount Lemmon Survey ||  || align=right data-sort-value="0.94" | 940 m || 
|-id=324 bgcolor=#E9E9E9
| 616324 ||  || — || August 30, 2005 || Anderson Mesa || LONEOS ||  || align=right | 1.7 km || 
|-id=325 bgcolor=#E9E9E9
| 616325 ||  || — || August 29, 2005 || Palomar || NEAT ||  || align=right | 1.2 km || 
|-id=326 bgcolor=#d6d6d6
| 616326 ||  || — || September 3, 2005 || Palomar || NEAT || Tj (2.98) || align=right | 3.5 km || 
|-id=327 bgcolor=#E9E9E9
| 616327 ||  || — || August 29, 2005 || Palomar || NEAT ||  || align=right | 1.3 km || 
|-id=328 bgcolor=#FA8072
| 616328 ||  || — || October 10, 2005 || Uccle || P. De Cat ||  || align=right data-sort-value="0.57" | 570 m || 
|-id=329 bgcolor=#E9E9E9
| 616329 ||  || — || October 6, 2005 || Kitt Peak || Spacewatch ||  || align=right | 2.1 km || 
|-id=330 bgcolor=#d6d6d6
| 616330 ||  || — || September 1, 2005 || Palomar || NEAT ||  || align=right | 3.1 km || 
|-id=331 bgcolor=#fefefe
| 616331 ||  || — || October 6, 2005 || Kitt Peak || Spacewatch ||  || align=right data-sort-value="0.73" | 730 m || 
|-id=332 bgcolor=#fefefe
| 616332 ||  || — || October 6, 2005 || Mount Lemmon || Mount Lemmon Survey ||  || align=right data-sort-value="0.69" | 690 m || 
|-id=333 bgcolor=#fefefe
| 616333 ||  || — || October 7, 2005 || Mount Lemmon || Mount Lemmon Survey ||  || align=right data-sort-value="0.58" | 580 m || 
|-id=334 bgcolor=#fefefe
| 616334 ||  || — || September 26, 2005 || Kitt Peak || Spacewatch ||  || align=right data-sort-value="0.60" | 600 m || 
|-id=335 bgcolor=#E9E9E9
| 616335 ||  || — || October 7, 2005 || Kitt Peak || Spacewatch ||  || align=right | 1.9 km || 
|-id=336 bgcolor=#E9E9E9
| 616336 ||  || — || October 7, 2005 || Kitt Peak || Spacewatch ||  || align=right | 2.0 km || 
|-id=337 bgcolor=#d6d6d6
| 616337 ||  || — || September 27, 2005 || Kitt Peak || Spacewatch ||  || align=right | 2.5 km || 
|-id=338 bgcolor=#fefefe
| 616338 ||  || — || September 30, 2005 || Mount Lemmon || Mount Lemmon Survey ||  || align=right data-sort-value="0.59" | 590 m || 
|-id=339 bgcolor=#E9E9E9
| 616339 ||  || — || October 7, 2005 || Kitt Peak || Spacewatch ||  || align=right | 1.5 km || 
|-id=340 bgcolor=#fefefe
| 616340 ||  || — || April 13, 2004 || Kitt Peak || Spacewatch ||  || align=right data-sort-value="0.73" | 730 m || 
|-id=341 bgcolor=#E9E9E9
| 616341 ||  || — || August 31, 2005 || Palomar || NEAT ||  || align=right | 1.7 km || 
|-id=342 bgcolor=#fefefe
| 616342 ||  || — || September 24, 2005 || Kitt Peak || Spacewatch ||  || align=right data-sort-value="0.74" | 740 m || 
|-id=343 bgcolor=#E9E9E9
| 616343 ||  || — || September 29, 2005 || Kitt Peak || Spacewatch ||  || align=right | 1.3 km || 
|-id=344 bgcolor=#E9E9E9
| 616344 ||  || — || October 9, 2005 || Kitt Peak || Spacewatch ||  || align=right | 1.7 km || 
|-id=345 bgcolor=#E9E9E9
| 616345 ||  || — || October 9, 2005 || Kitt Peak || Spacewatch ||  || align=right | 2.0 km || 
|-id=346 bgcolor=#E9E9E9
| 616346 ||  || — || September 23, 2005 || Kitt Peak || Spacewatch ||  || align=right | 2.1 km || 
|-id=347 bgcolor=#E9E9E9
| 616347 ||  || — || October 18, 2001 || Kitt Peak || Spacewatch ||  || align=right | 1.3 km || 
|-id=348 bgcolor=#fefefe
| 616348 ||  || — || October 4, 2005 || Mount Lemmon || Mount Lemmon Survey ||  || align=right data-sort-value="0.68" | 680 m || 
|-id=349 bgcolor=#fefefe
| 616349 ||  || — || September 23, 2005 || Kitt Peak || Spacewatch ||  || align=right data-sort-value="0.52" | 520 m || 
|-id=350 bgcolor=#fefefe
| 616350 ||  || — || October 5, 2005 || Kitt Peak || Spacewatch ||  || align=right data-sort-value="0.73" | 730 m || 
|-id=351 bgcolor=#fefefe
| 616351 ||  || — || October 2, 2005 || Palomar || NEAT ||  || align=right data-sort-value="0.89" | 890 m || 
|-id=352 bgcolor=#fefefe
| 616352 ||  || — || November 27, 2009 || Mount Lemmon || Mount Lemmon Survey ||  || align=right data-sort-value="0.65" | 650 m || 
|-id=353 bgcolor=#E9E9E9
| 616353 ||  || — || October 18, 1995 || Kitt Peak || Spacewatch ||  || align=right | 2.0 km || 
|-id=354 bgcolor=#fefefe
| 616354 ||  || — || October 11, 2005 || Kitt Peak || Spacewatch ||  || align=right data-sort-value="0.68" | 680 m || 
|-id=355 bgcolor=#fefefe
| 616355 ||  || — || October 1, 2005 || Kitt Peak || Spacewatch ||  || align=right data-sort-value="0.57" | 570 m || 
|-id=356 bgcolor=#fefefe
| 616356 ||  || — || February 9, 2014 || Haleakala || Pan-STARRS ||  || align=right data-sort-value="0.59" | 590 m || 
|-id=357 bgcolor=#E9E9E9
| 616357 ||  || — || December 20, 2001 || Apache Point || SDSS Collaboration ||  || align=right | 1.7 km || 
|-id=358 bgcolor=#E9E9E9
| 616358 ||  || — || January 26, 2017 || Haleakala || Pan-STARRS ||  || align=right | 2.8 km || 
|-id=359 bgcolor=#d6d6d6
| 616359 ||  || — || August 27, 2011 || Haleakala || Pan-STARRS || 7:4 || align=right | 3.1 km || 
|-id=360 bgcolor=#E9E9E9
| 616360 ||  || — || December 2, 2010 || Mount Lemmon || Mount Lemmon Survey ||  || align=right | 2.1 km || 
|-id=361 bgcolor=#fefefe
| 616361 ||  || — || October 1, 2005 || Kitt Peak || Spacewatch ||  || align=right data-sort-value="0.60" | 600 m || 
|-id=362 bgcolor=#d6d6d6
| 616362 ||  || — || October 13, 2005 || Kitt Peak || Spacewatch ||  || align=right | 2.5 km || 
|-id=363 bgcolor=#fefefe
| 616363 ||  || — || February 13, 2011 || Mount Lemmon || Mount Lemmon Survey ||  || align=right data-sort-value="0.57" | 570 m || 
|-id=364 bgcolor=#E9E9E9
| 616364 ||  || — || August 23, 2014 || Haleakala || Pan-STARRS ||  || align=right | 1.5 km || 
|-id=365 bgcolor=#E9E9E9
| 616365 ||  || — || November 13, 2010 || Mount Lemmon || Mount Lemmon Survey ||  || align=right | 1.6 km || 
|-id=366 bgcolor=#fefefe
| 616366 ||  || — || April 23, 2011 || Haleakala || Pan-STARRS ||  || align=right data-sort-value="0.70" | 700 m || 
|-id=367 bgcolor=#fefefe
| 616367 ||  || — || October 1, 2005 || Mount Lemmon || Mount Lemmon Survey ||  || align=right data-sort-value="0.62" | 620 m || 
|-id=368 bgcolor=#E9E9E9
| 616368 ||  || — || October 13, 2005 || Kitt Peak || Spacewatch ||  || align=right | 1.8 km || 
|-id=369 bgcolor=#d6d6d6
| 616369 ||  || — || October 1, 2005 || Mount Lemmon || Mount Lemmon Survey ||  || align=right | 1.7 km || 
|-id=370 bgcolor=#E9E9E9
| 616370 ||  || — || October 1, 2005 || Kitt Peak || Spacewatch ||  || align=right | 1.6 km || 
|-id=371 bgcolor=#d6d6d6
| 616371 ||  || — || October 4, 2005 || Mount Lemmon || Mount Lemmon Survey ||  || align=right | 1.7 km || 
|-id=372 bgcolor=#FA8072
| 616372 ||  || — || October 1, 2005 || Anderson Mesa || LONEOS ||  || align=right data-sort-value="0.53" | 530 m || 
|-id=373 bgcolor=#d6d6d6
| 616373 ||  || — || October 24, 2005 || Kitt Peak || Spacewatch ||  || align=right | 2.0 km || 
|-id=374 bgcolor=#fefefe
| 616374 ||  || — || October 22, 2005 || Kitt Peak || Spacewatch ||  || align=right data-sort-value="0.74" | 740 m || 
|-id=375 bgcolor=#fefefe
| 616375 ||  || — || October 23, 2005 || Palomar || NEAT ||  || align=right data-sort-value="0.63" | 630 m || 
|-id=376 bgcolor=#fefefe
| 616376 ||  || — || October 24, 2005 || Kitt Peak || Spacewatch ||  || align=right data-sort-value="0.90" | 900 m || 
|-id=377 bgcolor=#d6d6d6
| 616377 ||  || — || October 1, 2005 || Mount Lemmon || Mount Lemmon Survey ||  || align=right | 1.8 km || 
|-id=378 bgcolor=#fefefe
| 616378 ||  || — || October 22, 2005 || Kitt Peak || Spacewatch ||  || align=right data-sort-value="0.61" | 610 m || 
|-id=379 bgcolor=#fefefe
| 616379 ||  || — || September 23, 2005 || Kitt Peak || Spacewatch ||  || align=right data-sort-value="0.64" | 640 m || 
|-id=380 bgcolor=#E9E9E9
| 616380 ||  || — || October 22, 2005 || Kitt Peak || Spacewatch ||  || align=right | 1.8 km || 
|-id=381 bgcolor=#fefefe
| 616381 ||  || — || October 22, 2005 || Kitt Peak || Spacewatch ||  || align=right data-sort-value="0.57" | 570 m || 
|-id=382 bgcolor=#d6d6d6
| 616382 ||  || — || October 22, 2005 || Kitt Peak || Spacewatch ||  || align=right | 2.2 km || 
|-id=383 bgcolor=#E9E9E9
| 616383 ||  || — || October 22, 2005 || Kitt Peak || Spacewatch ||  || align=right | 1.0 km || 
|-id=384 bgcolor=#fefefe
| 616384 ||  || — || September 30, 2005 || Mount Lemmon || Mount Lemmon Survey ||  || align=right data-sort-value="0.56" | 560 m || 
|-id=385 bgcolor=#fefefe
| 616385 ||  || — || October 23, 2005 || Kitt Peak || Spacewatch ||  || align=right data-sort-value="0.52" | 520 m || 
|-id=386 bgcolor=#fefefe
| 616386 ||  || — || September 30, 2005 || Palomar || NEAT ||  || align=right data-sort-value="0.92" | 920 m || 
|-id=387 bgcolor=#d6d6d6
| 616387 ||  || — || October 25, 2005 || Kitt Peak || Spacewatch ||  || align=right | 1.5 km || 
|-id=388 bgcolor=#E9E9E9
| 616388 ||  || — || September 24, 2000 || Kitt Peak || Spacewatch ||  || align=right | 2.3 km || 
|-id=389 bgcolor=#E9E9E9
| 616389 ||  || — || October 25, 2005 || Mount Lemmon || Mount Lemmon Survey ||  || align=right data-sort-value="0.74" | 740 m || 
|-id=390 bgcolor=#E9E9E9
| 616390 ||  || — || October 1, 2005 || Mount Lemmon || Mount Lemmon Survey ||  || align=right | 2.0 km || 
|-id=391 bgcolor=#fefefe
| 616391 ||  || — || October 1, 2005 || Mount Lemmon || Mount Lemmon Survey ||  || align=right data-sort-value="0.63" | 630 m || 
|-id=392 bgcolor=#FA8072
| 616392 ||  || — || October 25, 2005 || Kitt Peak || Spacewatch ||  || align=right data-sort-value="0.61" | 610 m || 
|-id=393 bgcolor=#E9E9E9
| 616393 ||  || — || October 24, 2005 || Kitt Peak || Spacewatch ||  || align=right | 1.6 km || 
|-id=394 bgcolor=#fefefe
| 616394 ||  || — || October 1, 2005 || Mount Lemmon || Mount Lemmon Survey ||  || align=right data-sort-value="0.61" | 610 m || 
|-id=395 bgcolor=#fefefe
| 616395 ||  || — || September 30, 2005 || Mount Lemmon || Mount Lemmon Survey ||  || align=right data-sort-value="0.66" | 660 m || 
|-id=396 bgcolor=#fefefe
| 616396 ||  || — || September 29, 2005 || Kitt Peak || Spacewatch ||  || align=right data-sort-value="0.58" | 580 m || 
|-id=397 bgcolor=#d6d6d6
| 616397 ||  || — || October 24, 2005 || Kitt Peak || Spacewatch ||  || align=right | 1.7 km || 
|-id=398 bgcolor=#fefefe
| 616398 ||  || — || October 24, 2005 || Kitt Peak || Spacewatch ||  || align=right data-sort-value="0.72" | 720 m || 
|-id=399 bgcolor=#fefefe
| 616399 ||  || — || October 24, 2005 || Kitt Peak || Spacewatch ||  || align=right data-sort-value="0.66" | 660 m || 
|-id=400 bgcolor=#fefefe
| 616400 ||  || — || October 24, 2005 || Kitt Peak || Spacewatch ||  || align=right data-sort-value="0.66" | 660 m || 
|}

616401–616500 

|-bgcolor=#fefefe
| 616401 ||  || — || October 25, 2005 || Mount Lemmon || Mount Lemmon Survey ||  || align=right data-sort-value="0.71" | 710 m || 
|-id=402 bgcolor=#fefefe
| 616402 ||  || — || October 25, 2005 || Mount Lemmon || Mount Lemmon Survey ||  || align=right data-sort-value="0.51" | 510 m || 
|-id=403 bgcolor=#d6d6d6
| 616403 ||  || — || October 27, 2005 || Mount Lemmon || Mount Lemmon Survey ||  || align=right | 1.5 km || 
|-id=404 bgcolor=#fefefe
| 616404 ||  || — || October 27, 2005 || Mount Lemmon || Mount Lemmon Survey ||  || align=right data-sort-value="0.65" | 650 m || 
|-id=405 bgcolor=#E9E9E9
| 616405 ||  || — || October 22, 2005 || Kitt Peak || Spacewatch ||  || align=right | 1.7 km || 
|-id=406 bgcolor=#E9E9E9
| 616406 ||  || — || September 29, 2005 || Mount Lemmon || Mount Lemmon Survey ||  || align=right | 1.2 km || 
|-id=407 bgcolor=#d6d6d6
| 616407 ||  || — || October 25, 2005 || Mount Lemmon || Mount Lemmon Survey ||  || align=right | 1.6 km || 
|-id=408 bgcolor=#E9E9E9
| 616408 ||  || — || October 7, 2005 || Mount Lemmon || Mount Lemmon Survey ||  || align=right | 1.9 km || 
|-id=409 bgcolor=#E9E9E9
| 616409 ||  || — || October 25, 2005 || Kitt Peak || Spacewatch ||  || align=right | 1.9 km || 
|-id=410 bgcolor=#fefefe
| 616410 ||  || — || October 25, 2005 || Kitt Peak || Spacewatch ||  || align=right data-sort-value="0.74" | 740 m || 
|-id=411 bgcolor=#d6d6d6
| 616411 ||  || — || October 25, 2005 || Kitt Peak || Spacewatch ||  || align=right | 2.4 km || 
|-id=412 bgcolor=#fefefe
| 616412 ||  || — || October 25, 2005 || Kitt Peak || Spacewatch ||  || align=right data-sort-value="0.58" | 580 m || 
|-id=413 bgcolor=#d6d6d6
| 616413 ||  || — || October 27, 2005 || Kitt Peak || Spacewatch ||  || align=right | 1.8 km || 
|-id=414 bgcolor=#fefefe
| 616414 ||  || — || October 28, 2005 || Kitt Peak || Spacewatch ||  || align=right | 1.1 km || 
|-id=415 bgcolor=#fefefe
| 616415 ||  || — || October 25, 2005 || Kitt Peak || Spacewatch ||  || align=right data-sort-value="0.64" | 640 m || 
|-id=416 bgcolor=#E9E9E9
| 616416 ||  || — || October 26, 2005 || Kitt Peak || Spacewatch ||  || align=right | 2.1 km || 
|-id=417 bgcolor=#E9E9E9
| 616417 ||  || — || October 28, 2005 || Kitt Peak || Spacewatch ||  || align=right | 2.0 km || 
|-id=418 bgcolor=#fefefe
| 616418 ||  || — || October 28, 2005 || Kitt Peak || Spacewatch ||  || align=right data-sort-value="0.58" | 580 m || 
|-id=419 bgcolor=#d6d6d6
| 616419 ||  || — || October 27, 2005 || Kitt Peak || Spacewatch ||  || align=right | 2.8 km || 
|-id=420 bgcolor=#fefefe
| 616420 ||  || — || October 26, 2005 || Kitt Peak || Spacewatch ||  || align=right data-sort-value="0.72" | 720 m || 
|-id=421 bgcolor=#d6d6d6
| 616421 ||  || — || October 26, 2005 || Kitt Peak || Spacewatch ||  || align=right | 1.9 km || 
|-id=422 bgcolor=#E9E9E9
| 616422 ||  || — || October 27, 2005 || Socorro || LINEAR ||  || align=right | 2.5 km || 
|-id=423 bgcolor=#d6d6d6
| 616423 ||  || — || October 27, 2005 || Kitt Peak || Spacewatch ||  || align=right | 1.9 km || 
|-id=424 bgcolor=#fefefe
| 616424 ||  || — || October 29, 2005 || Mount Lemmon || Mount Lemmon Survey ||  || align=right data-sort-value="0.57" | 570 m || 
|-id=425 bgcolor=#E9E9E9
| 616425 ||  || — || October 29, 2005 || Kitt Peak || Spacewatch ||  || align=right | 1.1 km || 
|-id=426 bgcolor=#E9E9E9
| 616426 ||  || — || September 30, 2005 || Mount Lemmon || Mount Lemmon Survey ||  || align=right | 2.1 km || 
|-id=427 bgcolor=#fefefe
| 616427 ||  || — || October 22, 2005 || Kitt Peak || Spacewatch ||  || align=right data-sort-value="0.94" | 940 m || 
|-id=428 bgcolor=#d6d6d6
| 616428 ||  || — || October 29, 2005 || Mount Lemmon || Mount Lemmon Survey ||  || align=right | 1.6 km || 
|-id=429 bgcolor=#fefefe
| 616429 ||  || — || October 24, 2005 || Kitt Peak || Spacewatch ||  || align=right data-sort-value="0.49" | 490 m || 
|-id=430 bgcolor=#fefefe
| 616430 ||  || — || October 7, 2005 || Kitt Peak || Spacewatch ||  || align=right data-sort-value="0.67" | 670 m || 
|-id=431 bgcolor=#fefefe
| 616431 ||  || — || October 25, 2005 || Kitt Peak || Spacewatch ||  || align=right data-sort-value="0.60" | 600 m || 
|-id=432 bgcolor=#E9E9E9
| 616432 ||  || — || October 27, 2005 || Kitt Peak || Spacewatch ||  || align=right | 1.8 km || 
|-id=433 bgcolor=#d6d6d6
| 616433 ||  || — || September 29, 2005 || Mount Lemmon || Mount Lemmon Survey ||  || align=right | 2.2 km || 
|-id=434 bgcolor=#fefefe
| 616434 ||  || — || October 22, 2005 || Kitt Peak || Spacewatch ||  || align=right data-sort-value="0.58" | 580 m || 
|-id=435 bgcolor=#d6d6d6
| 616435 ||  || — || October 27, 2005 || Kitt Peak || Spacewatch ||  || align=right | 2.2 km || 
|-id=436 bgcolor=#E9E9E9
| 616436 ||  || — || October 27, 2005 || Kitt Peak || Spacewatch ||  || align=right | 2.0 km || 
|-id=437 bgcolor=#fefefe
| 616437 ||  || — || October 27, 2005 || Kitt Peak || Spacewatch ||  || align=right data-sort-value="0.70" | 700 m || 
|-id=438 bgcolor=#d6d6d6
| 616438 ||  || — || October 29, 2005 || Mount Lemmon || Mount Lemmon Survey ||  || align=right | 2.0 km || 
|-id=439 bgcolor=#E9E9E9
| 616439 ||  || — || October 26, 2005 || Kitt Peak || Spacewatch ||  || align=right | 1.9 km || 
|-id=440 bgcolor=#E9E9E9
| 616440 ||  || — || September 28, 2000 || Kitt Peak || Spacewatch ||  || align=right | 2.3 km || 
|-id=441 bgcolor=#E9E9E9
| 616441 ||  || — || October 27, 2005 || Kitt Peak || Spacewatch ||  || align=right | 1.9 km || 
|-id=442 bgcolor=#FA8072
| 616442 ||  || — || September 1, 2005 || Palomar || NEAT || H || align=right data-sort-value="0.76" | 760 m || 
|-id=443 bgcolor=#fefefe
| 616443 ||  || — || October 11, 2005 || Kitt Peak || Spacewatch ||  || align=right data-sort-value="0.72" | 720 m || 
|-id=444 bgcolor=#E9E9E9
| 616444 ||  || — || August 27, 2014 || Haleakala || Pan-STARRS ||  || align=right | 1.7 km || 
|-id=445 bgcolor=#E9E9E9
| 616445 ||  || — || October 25, 2005 || Kitt Peak || Spacewatch ||  || align=right | 1.7 km || 
|-id=446 bgcolor=#E9E9E9
| 616446 ||  || — || October 10, 2005 || Kitt Peak || Spacewatch ||  || align=right | 2.0 km || 
|-id=447 bgcolor=#E9E9E9
| 616447 ||  || — || October 27, 2005 || Mount Lemmon || Mount Lemmon Survey ||  || align=right data-sort-value="0.74" | 740 m || 
|-id=448 bgcolor=#fefefe
| 616448 ||  || — || October 29, 2005 || Kitt Peak || Spacewatch ||  || align=right data-sort-value="0.62" | 620 m || 
|-id=449 bgcolor=#FA8072
| 616449 ||  || — || September 13, 2005 || Socorro || LINEAR ||  || align=right data-sort-value="0.74" | 740 m || 
|-id=450 bgcolor=#FA8072
| 616450 ||  || — || October 27, 2005 || Kitt Peak || Spacewatch ||  || align=right data-sort-value="0.67" | 670 m || 
|-id=451 bgcolor=#E9E9E9
| 616451 ||  || — || October 28, 2005 || Mount Lemmon || Mount Lemmon Survey ||  || align=right | 1.7 km || 
|-id=452 bgcolor=#fefefe
| 616452 ||  || — || October 30, 2005 || Kitt Peak || Spacewatch ||  || align=right data-sort-value="0.57" | 570 m || 
|-id=453 bgcolor=#E9E9E9
| 616453 ||  || — || October 1, 2005 || Mount Lemmon || Mount Lemmon Survey ||  || align=right | 1.7 km || 
|-id=454 bgcolor=#E9E9E9
| 616454 ||  || — || October 30, 2005 || Kitt Peak || Spacewatch ||  || align=right | 1.9 km || 
|-id=455 bgcolor=#FA8072
| 616455 ||  || — || October 31, 2005 || Catalina || CSS ||  || align=right | 1.5 km || 
|-id=456 bgcolor=#fefefe
| 616456 ||  || — || September 3, 2005 || Palomar || NEAT ||  || align=right data-sort-value="0.87" | 870 m || 
|-id=457 bgcolor=#E9E9E9
| 616457 ||  || — || October 21, 2005 || Apache Point || SDSS Collaboration ||  || align=right | 1.7 km || 
|-id=458 bgcolor=#d6d6d6
| 616458 ||  || — || October 30, 2005 || Apache Point || SDSS Collaboration || 7:4 || align=right | 3.7 km || 
|-id=459 bgcolor=#E9E9E9
| 616459 ||  || — || September 30, 2005 || Mount Lemmon || Mount Lemmon Survey ||  || align=right | 1.4 km || 
|-id=460 bgcolor=#fefefe
| 616460 ||  || — || October 27, 2005 || Apache Point || SDSS Collaboration ||  || align=right data-sort-value="0.60" | 600 m || 
|-id=461 bgcolor=#E9E9E9
| 616461 ||  || — || February 21, 2007 || Mount Lemmon || Mount Lemmon Survey ||  || align=right | 1.7 km || 
|-id=462 bgcolor=#E9E9E9
| 616462 ||  || — || October 28, 2005 || Kitt Peak || Spacewatch ||  || align=right | 1.7 km || 
|-id=463 bgcolor=#E9E9E9
| 616463 ||  || — || October 6, 2005 || Mount Lemmon || Mount Lemmon Survey ||  || align=right | 1.6 km || 
|-id=464 bgcolor=#E9E9E9
| 616464 ||  || — || October 31, 2005 || Kitt Peak || Spacewatch ||  || align=right | 2.4 km || 
|-id=465 bgcolor=#E9E9E9
| 616465 ||  || — || October 27, 2005 || Mount Lemmon || Mount Lemmon Survey ||  || align=right | 1.7 km || 
|-id=466 bgcolor=#d6d6d6
| 616466 ||  || — || January 2, 2012 || Mount Lemmon || Mount Lemmon Survey ||  || align=right | 3.0 km || 
|-id=467 bgcolor=#fefefe
| 616467 ||  || — || October 29, 2005 || Mount Lemmon || Mount Lemmon Survey || critical || align=right data-sort-value="0.61" | 610 m || 
|-id=468 bgcolor=#fefefe
| 616468 ||  || — || October 22, 2005 || Kitt Peak || Spacewatch ||  || align=right data-sort-value="0.59" | 590 m || 
|-id=469 bgcolor=#fefefe
| 616469 ||  || — || March 2, 2011 || Kitt Peak || Spacewatch ||  || align=right data-sort-value="0.61" | 610 m || 
|-id=470 bgcolor=#fefefe
| 616470 ||  || — || March 31, 2015 || Haleakala || Pan-STARRS ||  || align=right data-sort-value="0.79" | 790 m || 
|-id=471 bgcolor=#fefefe
| 616471 ||  || — || January 22, 2015 || Haleakala || Pan-STARRS ||  || align=right data-sort-value="0.82" | 820 m || 
|-id=472 bgcolor=#d6d6d6
| 616472 ||  || — || December 27, 2006 || Mount Lemmon || Mount Lemmon Survey ||  || align=right | 1.8 km || 
|-id=473 bgcolor=#fefefe
| 616473 ||  || — || March 26, 2007 || Mount Lemmon || Mount Lemmon Survey ||  || align=right data-sort-value="0.62" | 620 m || 
|-id=474 bgcolor=#fefefe
| 616474 ||  || — || September 21, 2012 || Mount Lemmon || Mount Lemmon Survey ||  || align=right data-sort-value="0.72" | 720 m || 
|-id=475 bgcolor=#fefefe
| 616475 ||  || — || March 16, 2007 || Mount Lemmon || Mount Lemmon Survey ||  || align=right data-sort-value="0.67" | 670 m || 
|-id=476 bgcolor=#d6d6d6
| 616476 ||  || — || October 25, 2005 || Mount Lemmon || Mount Lemmon Survey ||  || align=right | 1.9 km || 
|-id=477 bgcolor=#E9E9E9
| 616477 ||  || — || November 3, 2005 || Mount Lemmon || Mount Lemmon Survey ||  || align=right | 2.1 km || 
|-id=478 bgcolor=#fefefe
| 616478 ||  || — || November 1, 2005 || Kitt Peak || Spacewatch ||  || align=right data-sort-value="0.91" | 910 m || 
|-id=479 bgcolor=#fefefe
| 616479 ||  || — || November 4, 2005 || Mount Lemmon || Mount Lemmon Survey ||  || align=right data-sort-value="0.60" | 600 m || 
|-id=480 bgcolor=#d6d6d6
| 616480 ||  || — || October 25, 2005 || Mount Lemmon || Mount Lemmon Survey ||  || align=right | 2.4 km || 
|-id=481 bgcolor=#fefefe
| 616481 ||  || — || November 3, 2005 || Catalina || CSS ||  || align=right data-sort-value="0.59" | 590 m || 
|-id=482 bgcolor=#fefefe
| 616482 ||  || — || April 13, 2004 || Kitt Peak || Spacewatch ||  || align=right data-sort-value="0.58" | 580 m || 
|-id=483 bgcolor=#fefefe
| 616483 ||  || — || November 3, 2005 || Mount Lemmon || Mount Lemmon Survey ||  || align=right data-sort-value="0.64" | 640 m || 
|-id=484 bgcolor=#E9E9E9
| 616484 ||  || — || November 4, 2005 || Kitt Peak || Spacewatch ||  || align=right | 1.8 km || 
|-id=485 bgcolor=#E9E9E9
| 616485 ||  || — || October 25, 2005 || Kitt Peak || Spacewatch ||  || align=right | 1.9 km || 
|-id=486 bgcolor=#fefefe
| 616486 ||  || — || November 3, 2005 || Kitt Peak || Spacewatch || H || align=right data-sort-value="0.45" | 450 m || 
|-id=487 bgcolor=#fefefe
| 616487 ||  || — || November 3, 2005 || Mount Lemmon || Mount Lemmon Survey ||  || align=right data-sort-value="0.61" | 610 m || 
|-id=488 bgcolor=#E9E9E9
| 616488 ||  || — || October 26, 2005 || Kitt Peak || Spacewatch ||  || align=right | 2.2 km || 
|-id=489 bgcolor=#fefefe
| 616489 ||  || — || November 3, 2005 || Mount Lemmon || Mount Lemmon Survey ||  || align=right data-sort-value="0.52" | 520 m || 
|-id=490 bgcolor=#fefefe
| 616490 ||  || — || October 24, 2005 || Kitt Peak || Spacewatch ||  || align=right data-sort-value="0.58" | 580 m || 
|-id=491 bgcolor=#d6d6d6
| 616491 ||  || — || October 26, 2005 || Apache Point || SDSS Collaboration ||  || align=right | 2.5 km || 
|-id=492 bgcolor=#d6d6d6
| 616492 ||  || — || October 25, 2005 || Apache Point || SDSS Collaboration ||  || align=right | 2.7 km || 
|-id=493 bgcolor=#fefefe
| 616493 ||  || — || November 6, 2005 || Mount Lemmon || Mount Lemmon Survey ||  || align=right data-sort-value="0.82" | 820 m || 
|-id=494 bgcolor=#E9E9E9
| 616494 ||  || — || November 1, 2005 || Kitt Peak || Spacewatch ||  || align=right | 1.9 km || 
|-id=495 bgcolor=#E9E9E9
| 616495 ||  || — || November 5, 2005 || Kitt Peak || Spacewatch ||  || align=right | 2.0 km || 
|-id=496 bgcolor=#fefefe
| 616496 ||  || — || October 12, 1998 || Anderson Mesa || LONEOS ||  || align=right | 1.1 km || 
|-id=497 bgcolor=#d6d6d6
| 616497 ||  || — || November 12, 2005 || Kitt Peak || Spacewatch ||  || align=right | 2.6 km || 
|-id=498 bgcolor=#E9E9E9
| 616498 ||  || — || April 15, 2013 || Haleakala || Pan-STARRS ||  || align=right | 1.8 km || 
|-id=499 bgcolor=#d6d6d6
| 616499 ||  || — || November 12, 2005 || Kitt Peak || Spacewatch ||  || align=right | 2.2 km || 
|-id=500 bgcolor=#fefefe
| 616500 ||  || — || May 29, 2008 || Kitt Peak || Spacewatch ||  || align=right data-sort-value="0.62" | 620 m || 
|}

616501–616600 

|-bgcolor=#fefefe
| 616501 ||  || — || November 4, 2005 || Kitt Peak || Spacewatch ||  || align=right data-sort-value="0.50" | 500 m || 
|-id=502 bgcolor=#fefefe
| 616502 ||  || — || October 20, 2012 || Haleakala || Pan-STARRS ||  || align=right data-sort-value="0.92" | 920 m || 
|-id=503 bgcolor=#d6d6d6
| 616503 ||  || — || November 4, 2005 || Mount Lemmon || Mount Lemmon Survey ||  || align=right | 2.6 km || 
|-id=504 bgcolor=#E9E9E9
| 616504 ||  || — || August 31, 2014 || Haleakala || Pan-STARRS ||  || align=right | 1.8 km || 
|-id=505 bgcolor=#E9E9E9
| 616505 ||  || — || November 6, 2005 || Mount Lemmon || Mount Lemmon Survey ||  || align=right | 1.1 km || 
|-id=506 bgcolor=#fefefe
| 616506 ||  || — || September 6, 2016 || Mount Lemmon || Mount Lemmon Survey ||  || align=right data-sort-value="0.67" | 670 m || 
|-id=507 bgcolor=#E9E9E9
| 616507 ||  || — || December 3, 2010 || Mount Lemmon || Mount Lemmon Survey ||  || align=right | 2.0 km || 
|-id=508 bgcolor=#fefefe
| 616508 ||  || — || October 28, 2005 || Mount Lemmon || Mount Lemmon Survey ||  || align=right data-sort-value="0.48" | 480 m || 
|-id=509 bgcolor=#fefefe
| 616509 ||  || — || November 1, 2005 || Mount Lemmon || Mount Lemmon Survey ||  || align=right data-sort-value="0.56" | 560 m || 
|-id=510 bgcolor=#E9E9E9
| 616510 ||  || — || November 22, 2005 || Kitt Peak || Spacewatch ||  || align=right | 1.9 km || 
|-id=511 bgcolor=#fefefe
| 616511 ||  || — || November 22, 2005 || Kitt Peak || Spacewatch ||  || align=right data-sort-value="0.55" | 550 m || 
|-id=512 bgcolor=#fefefe
| 616512 ||  || — || November 21, 2005 || Kitt Peak || Spacewatch ||  || align=right data-sort-value="0.83" | 830 m || 
|-id=513 bgcolor=#FA8072
| 616513 ||  || — || July 3, 2005 || Palomar || NEAT ||  || align=right | 1.1 km || 
|-id=514 bgcolor=#E9E9E9
| 616514 ||  || — || November 25, 2005 || Kitt Peak || Spacewatch ||  || align=right | 2.2 km || 
|-id=515 bgcolor=#d6d6d6
| 616515 ||  || — || November 26, 2005 || Mount Lemmon || Mount Lemmon Survey ||  || align=right | 2.3 km || 
|-id=516 bgcolor=#fefefe
| 616516 ||  || — || October 28, 2005 || Mount Lemmon || Mount Lemmon Survey ||  || align=right data-sort-value="0.72" | 720 m || 
|-id=517 bgcolor=#d6d6d6
| 616517 ||  || — || October 22, 2005 || Kitt Peak || Spacewatch ||  || align=right | 2.5 km || 
|-id=518 bgcolor=#d6d6d6
| 616518 ||  || — || November 29, 2005 || Kitt Peak || Spacewatch ||  || align=right | 2.5 km || 
|-id=519 bgcolor=#fefefe
| 616519 ||  || — || November 25, 2005 || Mount Lemmon || Mount Lemmon Survey ||  || align=right data-sort-value="0.56" | 560 m || 
|-id=520 bgcolor=#E9E9E9
| 616520 ||  || — || November 30, 2005 || Mount Lemmon || Mount Lemmon Survey ||  || align=right | 1.8 km || 
|-id=521 bgcolor=#fefefe
| 616521 ||  || — || October 30, 2005 || Mount Lemmon || Mount Lemmon Survey ||  || align=right data-sort-value="0.74" | 740 m || 
|-id=522 bgcolor=#d6d6d6
| 616522 ||  || — || November 30, 2005 || Kitt Peak || Spacewatch ||  || align=right | 2.1 km || 
|-id=523 bgcolor=#E9E9E9
| 616523 ||  || — || November 17, 2014 || Haleakala || Pan-STARRS ||  || align=right | 1.3 km || 
|-id=524 bgcolor=#d6d6d6
| 616524 ||  || — || November 25, 2005 || Mount Lemmon || Mount Lemmon Survey ||  || align=right | 2.0 km || 
|-id=525 bgcolor=#d6d6d6
| 616525 ||  || — || November 25, 2005 || Mount Lemmon || Mount Lemmon Survey ||  || align=right | 1.6 km || 
|-id=526 bgcolor=#d6d6d6
| 616526 ||  || — || November 25, 2005 || Mount Lemmon || Mount Lemmon Survey ||  || align=right | 2.0 km || 
|-id=527 bgcolor=#E9E9E9
| 616527 ||  || — || November 29, 2005 || Anderson Mesa || LONEOS ||  || align=right | 3.7 km || 
|-id=528 bgcolor=#fefefe
| 616528 ||  || — || October 25, 2005 || Mount Lemmon || Mount Lemmon Survey ||  || align=right data-sort-value="0.94" | 940 m || 
|-id=529 bgcolor=#E9E9E9
| 616529 ||  || — || November 30, 2005 || Kitt Peak || Spacewatch ||  || align=right data-sort-value="0.55" | 550 m || 
|-id=530 bgcolor=#d6d6d6
| 616530 ||  || — || November 28, 2005 || Kitt Peak || Spacewatch ||  || align=right | 2.6 km || 
|-id=531 bgcolor=#fefefe
| 616531 ||  || — || November 25, 2005 || Mount Lemmon || Mount Lemmon Survey ||  || align=right | 1.0 km || 
|-id=532 bgcolor=#fefefe
| 616532 ||  || — || November 26, 2005 || Mount Lemmon || Mount Lemmon Survey ||  || align=right data-sort-value="0.63" | 630 m || 
|-id=533 bgcolor=#d6d6d6
| 616533 ||  || — || October 1, 2014 || Haleakala || Pan-STARRS ||  || align=right | 2.3 km || 
|-id=534 bgcolor=#E9E9E9
| 616534 ||  || — || June 7, 2013 || Haleakala || Pan-STARRS ||  || align=right | 1.9 km || 
|-id=535 bgcolor=#fefefe
| 616535 ||  || — || March 30, 2011 || Catalina || CSS ||  || align=right data-sort-value="0.82" | 820 m || 
|-id=536 bgcolor=#d6d6d6
| 616536 ||  || — || November 25, 2005 || Kitt Peak || Spacewatch ||  || align=right | 1.7 km || 
|-id=537 bgcolor=#fefefe
| 616537 ||  || — || November 26, 2005 || Mount Lemmon || Mount Lemmon Survey ||  || align=right data-sort-value="0.60" | 600 m || 
|-id=538 bgcolor=#d6d6d6
| 616538 ||  || — || November 21, 2005 || Kitt Peak || Spacewatch ||  || align=right | 2.7 km || 
|-id=539 bgcolor=#E9E9E9
| 616539 ||  || — || December 2, 2005 || Mount Lemmon || Mount Lemmon Survey ||  || align=right | 1.8 km || 
|-id=540 bgcolor=#E9E9E9
| 616540 ||  || — || October 29, 2005 || Catalina || CSS ||  || align=right | 1.3 km || 
|-id=541 bgcolor=#E9E9E9
| 616541 ||  || — || December 1, 2005 || Mount Lemmon || Mount Lemmon Survey ||  || align=right | 2.0 km || 
|-id=542 bgcolor=#E9E9E9
| 616542 ||  || — || November 12, 2005 || Kitt Peak || Spacewatch ||  || align=right | 1.6 km || 
|-id=543 bgcolor=#fefefe
| 616543 ||  || — || December 2, 2005 || Mount Lemmon || Mount Lemmon Survey ||  || align=right data-sort-value="0.94" | 940 m || 
|-id=544 bgcolor=#E9E9E9
| 616544 ||  || — || December 1, 2005 || Kitt Peak || Spacewatch ||  || align=right | 1.7 km || 
|-id=545 bgcolor=#fefefe
| 616545 ||  || — || October 17, 2001 || Socorro || LINEAR ||  || align=right data-sort-value="0.79" | 790 m || 
|-id=546 bgcolor=#E9E9E9
| 616546 ||  || — || December 4, 2005 || Mount Lemmon || Mount Lemmon Survey ||  || align=right | 1.9 km || 
|-id=547 bgcolor=#fefefe
| 616547 ||  || — || December 5, 2005 || Kitt Peak || Spacewatch ||  || align=right data-sort-value="0.81" | 810 m || 
|-id=548 bgcolor=#E9E9E9
| 616548 ||  || — || December 2, 2005 || Kitt Peak || Spacewatch ||  || align=right | 1.3 km || 
|-id=549 bgcolor=#E9E9E9
| 616549 ||  || — || December 2, 2005 || Kitt Peak || Spacewatch ||  || align=right | 1.8 km || 
|-id=550 bgcolor=#fefefe
| 616550 ||  || — || December 5, 2005 || Mount Lemmon || Mount Lemmon Survey ||  || align=right data-sort-value="0.73" | 730 m || 
|-id=551 bgcolor=#E9E9E9
| 616551 ||  || — || December 1, 2005 || Kitt Peak || Spacewatch ||  || align=right | 1.6 km || 
|-id=552 bgcolor=#d6d6d6
| 616552 ||  || — || December 5, 2005 || Mount Lemmon || Mount Lemmon Survey ||  || align=right | 1.4 km || 
|-id=553 bgcolor=#d6d6d6
| 616553 ||  || — || December 7, 2005 || Kitt Peak || Spacewatch ||  || align=right | 2.3 km || 
|-id=554 bgcolor=#fefefe
| 616554 ||  || — || November 10, 2005 || Kitt Peak || Spacewatch || H || align=right data-sort-value="0.60" | 600 m || 
|-id=555 bgcolor=#E9E9E9
| 616555 ||  || — || December 1, 2005 || Kitt Peak || L. H. Wasserman, R. Millis ||  || align=right | 1.9 km || 
|-id=556 bgcolor=#E9E9E9
| 616556 ||  || — || October 1, 2005 || Kitt Peak || Spacewatch ||  || align=right | 1.8 km || 
|-id=557 bgcolor=#fefefe
| 616557 ||  || — || December 1, 2005 || Kitt Peak || L. H. Wasserman, R. Millis ||  || align=right data-sort-value="0.46" | 460 m || 
|-id=558 bgcolor=#E9E9E9
| 616558 ||  || — || December 1, 2005 || Kitt Peak || L. H. Wasserman, R. Millis ||  || align=right | 1.1 km || 
|-id=559 bgcolor=#fefefe
| 616559 ||  || — || December 1, 2005 || Kitt Peak || L. H. Wasserman, R. Millis ||  || align=right data-sort-value="0.76" | 760 m || 
|-id=560 bgcolor=#C2E0FF
| 616560 ||  || — || December 2, 2005 || Kitt Peak || L. H. Wasserman, R. Millis || res2:5critical || align=right | 218 km || 
|-id=561 bgcolor=#fefefe
| 616561 ||  || — || December 26, 2009 || Kitt Peak || Spacewatch ||  || align=right data-sort-value="0.87" | 870 m || 
|-id=562 bgcolor=#fefefe
| 616562 ||  || — || February 16, 2010 || Mount Lemmon || Mount Lemmon Survey ||  || align=right data-sort-value="0.69" | 690 m || 
|-id=563 bgcolor=#d6d6d6
| 616563 ||  || — || December 4, 2005 || Kitt Peak || Spacewatch ||  || align=right | 2.2 km || 
|-id=564 bgcolor=#d6d6d6
| 616564 ||  || — || December 1, 2005 || Kitt Peak || Spacewatch ||  || align=right | 2.1 km || 
|-id=565 bgcolor=#fefefe
| 616565 ||  || — || July 1, 2008 || Kitt Peak || Spacewatch ||  || align=right data-sort-value="0.85" | 850 m || 
|-id=566 bgcolor=#E9E9E9
| 616566 ||  || — || April 14, 2013 || Mount Lemmon || Mount Lemmon Survey ||  || align=right | 1.5 km || 
|-id=567 bgcolor=#E9E9E9
| 616567 ||  || — || March 23, 2012 || Mount Lemmon || Mount Lemmon Survey ||  || align=right | 1.4 km || 
|-id=568 bgcolor=#C2FFFF
| 616568 ||  || — || December 2, 2005 || Kitt Peak || L. H. Wasserman, R. Millis || L5 || align=right | 7.8 km || 
|-id=569 bgcolor=#fefefe
| 616569 ||  || — || December 22, 2005 || Kitt Peak || Spacewatch ||  || align=right data-sort-value="0.67" | 670 m || 
|-id=570 bgcolor=#E9E9E9
| 616570 ||  || — || December 22, 2005 || Kitt Peak || Spacewatch ||  || align=right | 1.8 km || 
|-id=571 bgcolor=#d6d6d6
| 616571 ||  || — || December 1, 2005 || Kitt Peak || Spacewatch ||  || align=right | 2.8 km || 
|-id=572 bgcolor=#fefefe
| 616572 ||  || — || December 24, 2005 || Kitt Peak || Spacewatch ||  || align=right data-sort-value="0.76" | 760 m || 
|-id=573 bgcolor=#fefefe
| 616573 ||  || — || December 25, 2005 || Kitt Peak || Spacewatch ||  || align=right data-sort-value="0.75" | 750 m || 
|-id=574 bgcolor=#d6d6d6
| 616574 ||  || — || December 25, 2005 || Mount Lemmon || Mount Lemmon Survey ||  || align=right | 1.8 km || 
|-id=575 bgcolor=#d6d6d6
| 616575 ||  || — || December 26, 2005 || Kitt Peak || Spacewatch ||  || align=right | 2.3 km || 
|-id=576 bgcolor=#d6d6d6
| 616576 ||  || — || December 28, 2005 || Kitt Peak || Spacewatch ||  || align=right | 2.3 km || 
|-id=577 bgcolor=#E9E9E9
| 616577 ||  || — || December 5, 2005 || Mount Lemmon || Mount Lemmon Survey ||  || align=right | 1.4 km || 
|-id=578 bgcolor=#fefefe
| 616578 ||  || — || December 29, 2005 || Mount Lemmon || Mount Lemmon Survey ||  || align=right data-sort-value="0.79" | 790 m || 
|-id=579 bgcolor=#fefefe
| 616579 ||  || — || December 25, 2005 || Kitt Peak || Spacewatch ||  || align=right data-sort-value="0.55" | 550 m || 
|-id=580 bgcolor=#E9E9E9
| 616580 ||  || — || December 29, 2005 || Mount Lemmon || Mount Lemmon Survey ||  || align=right | 1.1 km || 
|-id=581 bgcolor=#d6d6d6
| 616581 ||  || — || December 27, 2005 || Kitt Peak || Spacewatch ||  || align=right | 1.8 km || 
|-id=582 bgcolor=#fefefe
| 616582 ||  || — || December 27, 2005 || Kitt Peak || Spacewatch ||  || align=right data-sort-value="0.83" | 830 m || 
|-id=583 bgcolor=#fefefe
| 616583 ||  || — || December 27, 2005 || Mount Lemmon || Mount Lemmon Survey ||  || align=right data-sort-value="0.70" | 700 m || 
|-id=584 bgcolor=#fefefe
| 616584 ||  || — || December 22, 2005 || Kitt Peak || Spacewatch ||  || align=right data-sort-value="0.68" | 680 m || 
|-id=585 bgcolor=#E9E9E9
| 616585 ||  || — || December 25, 2005 || Mount Lemmon || Mount Lemmon Survey ||  || align=right | 1.8 km || 
|-id=586 bgcolor=#FA8072
| 616586 ||  || — || November 28, 2005 || Palomar || NEAT ||  || align=right data-sort-value="0.76" | 760 m || 
|-id=587 bgcolor=#d6d6d6
| 616587 ||  || — || December 30, 2005 || Kitt Peak || Spacewatch ||  || align=right | 1.8 km || 
|-id=588 bgcolor=#fefefe
| 616588 ||  || — || December 27, 2005 || Kitt Peak || Spacewatch ||  || align=right data-sort-value="0.75" | 750 m || 
|-id=589 bgcolor=#d6d6d6
| 616589 ||  || — || December 28, 2005 || Kitt Peak || Spacewatch ||  || align=right | 2.0 km || 
|-id=590 bgcolor=#d6d6d6
| 616590 ||  || — || December 30, 2005 || Kitt Peak || Spacewatch ||  || align=right | 2.0 km || 
|-id=591 bgcolor=#E9E9E9
| 616591 ||  || — || December 30, 2005 || Kitt Peak || Spacewatch ||  || align=right | 1.9 km || 
|-id=592 bgcolor=#fefefe
| 616592 ||  || — || December 28, 2005 || Kitt Peak || Spacewatch ||  || align=right data-sort-value="0.73" | 730 m || 
|-id=593 bgcolor=#E9E9E9
| 616593 ||  || — || December 2, 2005 || Kitt Peak || Spacewatch ||  || align=right | 1.9 km || 
|-id=594 bgcolor=#d6d6d6
| 616594 ||  || — || November 26, 2005 || Mount Lemmon || Mount Lemmon Survey ||  || align=right | 2.1 km || 
|-id=595 bgcolor=#d6d6d6
| 616595 ||  || — || March 16, 2012 || Haleakala || Pan-STARRS ||  || align=right | 2.3 km || 
|-id=596 bgcolor=#fefefe
| 616596 ||  || — || December 3, 2012 || Mount Lemmon || Mount Lemmon Survey ||  || align=right data-sort-value="0.65" | 650 m || 
|-id=597 bgcolor=#d6d6d6
| 616597 ||  || — || August 28, 2009 || Kitt Peak || Spacewatch ||  || align=right | 1.8 km || 
|-id=598 bgcolor=#d6d6d6
| 616598 ||  || — || December 30, 2005 || Kitt Peak || Spacewatch ||  || align=right | 2.1 km || 
|-id=599 bgcolor=#d6d6d6
| 616599 ||  || — || January 5, 2006 || Kitt Peak || Spacewatch ||  || align=right | 2.1 km || 
|-id=600 bgcolor=#fefefe
| 616600 ||  || — || December 24, 2005 || Kitt Peak || Spacewatch ||  || align=right data-sort-value="0.73" | 730 m || 
|}

616601–616700 

|-bgcolor=#d6d6d6
| 616601 ||  || — || January 6, 2006 || Kitt Peak || Spacewatch || 7:4 || align=right | 2.5 km || 
|-id=602 bgcolor=#E9E9E9
| 616602 ||  || — || January 6, 2006 || Kitt Peak || Spacewatch ||  || align=right | 1.5 km || 
|-id=603 bgcolor=#fefefe
| 616603 ||  || — || January 6, 2006 || Socorro || LINEAR ||  || align=right data-sort-value="0.78" | 780 m || 
|-id=604 bgcolor=#fefefe
| 616604 ||  || — || January 2, 2006 || Mount Lemmon || Mount Lemmon Survey ||  || align=right data-sort-value="0.58" | 580 m || 
|-id=605 bgcolor=#fefefe
| 616605 ||  || — || February 23, 2006 || Anderson Mesa || LONEOS ||  || align=right data-sort-value="0.83" | 830 m || 
|-id=606 bgcolor=#d6d6d6
| 616606 ||  || — || December 25, 2005 || Kitt Peak || Spacewatch ||  || align=right | 2.0 km || 
|-id=607 bgcolor=#fefefe
| 616607 ||  || — || September 4, 2008 || Kitt Peak || Spacewatch ||  || align=right data-sort-value="0.67" | 670 m || 
|-id=608 bgcolor=#fefefe
| 616608 ||  || — || September 29, 2008 || Catalina || CSS ||  || align=right data-sort-value="0.73" | 730 m || 
|-id=609 bgcolor=#fefefe
| 616609 ||  || — || January 22, 2006 || Mount Lemmon || Mount Lemmon Survey ||  || align=right data-sort-value="0.83" | 830 m || 
|-id=610 bgcolor=#fefefe
| 616610 ||  || — || January 22, 2006 || Anderson Mesa || LONEOS ||  || align=right data-sort-value="0.66" | 660 m || 
|-id=611 bgcolor=#d6d6d6
| 616611 ||  || — || January 23, 2006 || Kitt Peak || Spacewatch ||  || align=right | 3.3 km || 
|-id=612 bgcolor=#E9E9E9
| 616612 ||  || — || January 26, 2006 || Kitt Peak || Spacewatch ||  || align=right data-sort-value="0.69" | 690 m || 
|-id=613 bgcolor=#E9E9E9
| 616613 ||  || — || January 7, 2006 || Mount Lemmon || Mount Lemmon Survey ||  || align=right | 1.1 km || 
|-id=614 bgcolor=#fefefe
| 616614 ||  || — || December 24, 2005 || Kitt Peak || Spacewatch ||  || align=right data-sort-value="0.81" | 810 m || 
|-id=615 bgcolor=#E9E9E9
| 616615 ||  || — || January 26, 2006 || Mount Lemmon || Mount Lemmon Survey ||  || align=right data-sort-value="0.73" | 730 m || 
|-id=616 bgcolor=#d6d6d6
| 616616 ||  || — || January 26, 2006 || Kitt Peak || Spacewatch || Tj (2.93) || align=right | 2.6 km || 
|-id=617 bgcolor=#fefefe
| 616617 ||  || — || January 28, 2006 || Mount Lemmon || Mount Lemmon Survey ||  || align=right data-sort-value="0.56" | 560 m || 
|-id=618 bgcolor=#fefefe
| 616618 ||  || — || January 22, 2006 || Catalina || CSS ||  || align=right data-sort-value="0.94" | 940 m || 
|-id=619 bgcolor=#fefefe
| 616619 ||  || — || January 25, 2006 || Kitt Peak || Spacewatch ||  || align=right data-sort-value="0.76" | 760 m || 
|-id=620 bgcolor=#d6d6d6
| 616620 ||  || — || January 25, 2006 || Kitt Peak || Spacewatch ||  || align=right | 2.3 km || 
|-id=621 bgcolor=#fefefe
| 616621 ||  || — || January 9, 2006 || Kitt Peak || Spacewatch ||  || align=right data-sort-value="0.53" | 530 m || 
|-id=622 bgcolor=#fefefe
| 616622 ||  || — || January 27, 2006 || Kitt Peak || Spacewatch ||  || align=right data-sort-value="0.51" | 510 m || 
|-id=623 bgcolor=#d6d6d6
| 616623 ||  || — || October 7, 2005 || Mauna Kea || Mauna Kea Obs. ||  || align=right | 1.7 km || 
|-id=624 bgcolor=#fefefe
| 616624 ||  || — || January 27, 2006 || Mount Lemmon || Mount Lemmon Survey ||  || align=right data-sort-value="0.64" | 640 m || 
|-id=625 bgcolor=#d6d6d6
| 616625 ||  || — || January 30, 2006 || Kitt Peak || Spacewatch ||  || align=right | 2.2 km || 
|-id=626 bgcolor=#fefefe
| 616626 ||  || — || August 22, 2004 || Kitt Peak || Spacewatch ||  || align=right data-sort-value="0.79" | 790 m || 
|-id=627 bgcolor=#fefefe
| 616627 ||  || — || January 27, 2006 || Catalina || CSS || H || align=right data-sort-value="0.70" | 700 m || 
|-id=628 bgcolor=#d6d6d6
| 616628 ||  || — || July 5, 2003 || Kitt Peak || Spacewatch ||  || align=right | 2.2 km || 
|-id=629 bgcolor=#d6d6d6
| 616629 ||  || — || January 30, 2006 || Kitt Peak || Spacewatch ||  || align=right | 3.2 km || 
|-id=630 bgcolor=#d6d6d6
| 616630 ||  || — || January 23, 2006 || Kitt Peak || Spacewatch ||  || align=right | 1.7 km || 
|-id=631 bgcolor=#d6d6d6
| 616631 ||  || — || January 31, 2006 || Kitt Peak || Spacewatch ||  || align=right | 2.2 km || 
|-id=632 bgcolor=#d6d6d6
| 616632 ||  || — || January 31, 2006 || Kitt Peak || Spacewatch ||  || align=right | 2.2 km || 
|-id=633 bgcolor=#d6d6d6
| 616633 ||  || — || January 31, 2006 || Mount Lemmon || Mount Lemmon Survey ||  || align=right | 2.2 km || 
|-id=634 bgcolor=#d6d6d6
| 616634 ||  || — || August 22, 2014 || Haleakala || Pan-STARRS ||  || align=right | 2.5 km || 
|-id=635 bgcolor=#fefefe
| 616635 ||  || — || October 6, 2008 || Mount Lemmon || Mount Lemmon Survey ||  || align=right data-sort-value="0.80" | 800 m || 
|-id=636 bgcolor=#fefefe
| 616636 ||  || — || July 30, 2008 || Mount Lemmon || Mount Lemmon Survey ||  || align=right data-sort-value="0.58" | 580 m || 
|-id=637 bgcolor=#fefefe
| 616637 ||  || — || August 21, 2008 || Kitt Peak || Spacewatch ||  || align=right data-sort-value="0.60" | 600 m || 
|-id=638 bgcolor=#fefefe
| 616638 ||  || — || January 28, 2006 || Kitt Peak || Spacewatch ||  || align=right data-sort-value="0.74" | 740 m || 
|-id=639 bgcolor=#d6d6d6
| 616639 ||  || — || March 2, 2012 || Mount Lemmon || Mount Lemmon Survey ||  || align=right | 2.1 km || 
|-id=640 bgcolor=#d6d6d6
| 616640 ||  || — || January 31, 2006 || Kitt Peak || Spacewatch ||  || align=right | 2.0 km || 
|-id=641 bgcolor=#d6d6d6
| 616641 ||  || — || February 1, 2006 || Mount Lemmon || Mount Lemmon Survey ||  || align=right | 1.9 km || 
|-id=642 bgcolor=#fefefe
| 616642 ||  || — || February 1, 2006 || Mount Lemmon || Mount Lemmon Survey ||  || align=right data-sort-value="0.51" | 510 m || 
|-id=643 bgcolor=#fefefe
| 616643 ||  || — || February 4, 2006 || Catalina || CSS || H || align=right data-sort-value="0.54" | 540 m || 
|-id=644 bgcolor=#fefefe
| 616644 ||  || — || February 1, 2006 || Kitt Peak || Spacewatch ||  || align=right data-sort-value="0.57" | 570 m || 
|-id=645 bgcolor=#E9E9E9
| 616645 ||  || — || February 1, 2006 || Mount Lemmon || Mount Lemmon Survey ||  || align=right | 1.8 km || 
|-id=646 bgcolor=#d6d6d6
| 616646 ||  || — || February 2, 2006 || Kitt Peak || Spacewatch ||  || align=right | 2.9 km || 
|-id=647 bgcolor=#d6d6d6
| 616647 ||  || — || October 24, 2005 || Mauna Kea || Mauna Kea Obs. ||  || align=right | 2.7 km || 
|-id=648 bgcolor=#E9E9E9
| 616648 ||  || — || May 27, 2003 || Kitt Peak || Spacewatch ||  || align=right | 2.2 km || 
|-id=649 bgcolor=#d6d6d6
| 616649 ||  || — || January 26, 2006 || Kitt Peak || Spacewatch || Tj (2.99) || align=right | 2.5 km || 
|-id=650 bgcolor=#d6d6d6
| 616650 ||  || — || January 30, 2011 || Mount Lemmon || Mount Lemmon Survey ||  || align=right | 2.1 km || 
|-id=651 bgcolor=#d6d6d6
| 616651 ||  || — || January 30, 2006 || Kitt Peak || Spacewatch ||  || align=right | 1.6 km || 
|-id=652 bgcolor=#d6d6d6
| 616652 ||  || — || December 2, 2005 || Kitt Peak || L. H. Wasserman, R. Millis ||  || align=right | 1.8 km || 
|-id=653 bgcolor=#fefefe
| 616653 ||  || — || February 21, 2006 || Mount Lemmon || Mount Lemmon Survey ||  || align=right data-sort-value="0.82" | 820 m || 
|-id=654 bgcolor=#d6d6d6
| 616654 ||  || — || February 22, 2006 || Palomar || NEAT ||  || align=right | 4.1 km || 
|-id=655 bgcolor=#d6d6d6
| 616655 ||  || — || January 23, 2006 || Kitt Peak || Spacewatch ||  || align=right | 2.9 km || 
|-id=656 bgcolor=#fefefe
| 616656 ||  || — || February 24, 2006 || Kitt Peak || Spacewatch ||  || align=right data-sort-value="0.55" | 550 m || 
|-id=657 bgcolor=#fefefe
| 616657 ||  || — || January 26, 2006 || Kitt Peak || Spacewatch ||  || align=right data-sort-value="0.59" | 590 m || 
|-id=658 bgcolor=#d6d6d6
| 616658 ||  || — || February 27, 2006 || Mount Lemmon || Mount Lemmon Survey || critical || align=right | 2.1 km || 
|-id=659 bgcolor=#fefefe
| 616659 ||  || — || January 26, 2006 || Mount Lemmon || Mount Lemmon Survey ||  || align=right data-sort-value="0.77" | 770 m || 
|-id=660 bgcolor=#fefefe
| 616660 ||  || — || February 25, 2006 || Kitt Peak || Spacewatch ||  || align=right | 1.1 km || 
|-id=661 bgcolor=#d6d6d6
| 616661 ||  || — || February 25, 2006 || Kitt Peak || Spacewatch ||  || align=right | 2.8 km || 
|-id=662 bgcolor=#fefefe
| 616662 ||  || — || February 25, 2006 || Kitt Peak || Spacewatch ||  || align=right data-sort-value="0.52" | 520 m || 
|-id=663 bgcolor=#d6d6d6
| 616663 ||  || — || February 25, 2006 || Kitt Peak || Spacewatch || Tj (2.88) || align=right | 2.6 km || 
|-id=664 bgcolor=#d6d6d6
| 616664 ||  || — || February 27, 2006 || Kitt Peak || Spacewatch ||  || align=right | 2.3 km || 
|-id=665 bgcolor=#d6d6d6
| 616665 ||  || — || February 27, 2006 || Kitt Peak || Spacewatch ||  || align=right | 2.1 km || 
|-id=666 bgcolor=#d6d6d6
| 616666 ||  || — || December 3, 2005 || Mauna Kea || Mauna Kea Obs. ||  || align=right | 2.4 km || 
|-id=667 bgcolor=#fefefe
| 616667 ||  || — || February 27, 2006 || Mount Lemmon || Mount Lemmon Survey ||  || align=right data-sort-value="0.50" | 500 m || 
|-id=668 bgcolor=#fefefe
| 616668 ||  || — || March 16, 2010 || Mount Lemmon || Mount Lemmon Survey ||  || align=right data-sort-value="0.96" | 960 m || 
|-id=669 bgcolor=#d6d6d6
| 616669 ||  || — || February 27, 2006 || Kitt Peak || Spacewatch ||  || align=right | 2.1 km || 
|-id=670 bgcolor=#E9E9E9
| 616670 ||  || — || February 27, 2006 || Kitt Peak || Spacewatch ||  || align=right | 2.1 km || 
|-id=671 bgcolor=#fefefe
| 616671 ||  || — || January 26, 2006 || Kitt Peak || Spacewatch ||  || align=right data-sort-value="0.56" | 560 m || 
|-id=672 bgcolor=#E9E9E9
| 616672 ||  || — || February 27, 2006 || Kitt Peak || Spacewatch ||  || align=right | 1.3 km || 
|-id=673 bgcolor=#E9E9E9
| 616673 ||  || — || February 27, 2006 || Kitt Peak || Spacewatch ||  || align=right | 1.0 km || 
|-id=674 bgcolor=#fefefe
| 616674 ||  || — || March 18, 2010 || Mount Lemmon || Mount Lemmon Survey ||  || align=right data-sort-value="0.63" | 630 m || 
|-id=675 bgcolor=#d6d6d6
| 616675 ||  || — || January 26, 2011 || Mount Lemmon || Mount Lemmon Survey ||  || align=right | 2.0 km || 
|-id=676 bgcolor=#fefefe
| 616676 ||  || — || April 23, 2014 || Mount Lemmon || Mount Lemmon Survey ||  || align=right data-sort-value="0.81" | 810 m || 
|-id=677 bgcolor=#E9E9E9
| 616677 ||  || — || March 2, 2006 || Kitt Peak || Spacewatch ||  || align=right | 1.7 km || 
|-id=678 bgcolor=#d6d6d6
| 616678 ||  || — || February 21, 2006 || Mount Lemmon || Mount Lemmon Survey ||  || align=right | 1.9 km || 
|-id=679 bgcolor=#d6d6d6
| 616679 ||  || — || February 20, 2006 || Mount Lemmon || Mount Lemmon Survey ||  || align=right | 2.5 km || 
|-id=680 bgcolor=#d6d6d6
| 616680 ||  || — || March 2, 2006 || Kitt Peak || Spacewatch ||  || align=right | 2.3 km || 
|-id=681 bgcolor=#d6d6d6
| 616681 ||  || — || February 20, 2006 || Kitt Peak || Spacewatch ||  || align=right | 2.0 km || 
|-id=682 bgcolor=#fefefe
| 616682 ||  || — || March 4, 2006 || Kitt Peak || Spacewatch ||  || align=right data-sort-value="0.81" | 810 m || 
|-id=683 bgcolor=#d6d6d6
| 616683 ||  || — || January 22, 2006 || Mount Lemmon || Mount Lemmon Survey ||  || align=right | 2.1 km || 
|-id=684 bgcolor=#fefefe
| 616684 ||  || — || February 25, 2006 || Mount Lemmon || Mount Lemmon Survey ||  || align=right data-sort-value="0.53" | 530 m || 
|-id=685 bgcolor=#d6d6d6
| 616685 ||  || — || March 4, 2006 || Kitt Peak || Spacewatch ||  || align=right | 2.4 km || 
|-id=686 bgcolor=#fefefe
| 616686 ||  || — || November 4, 2004 || Kitt Peak || Spacewatch ||  || align=right data-sort-value="0.97" | 970 m || 
|-id=687 bgcolor=#d6d6d6
| 616687 ||  || — || September 6, 2008 || Kitt Peak || Spacewatch ||  || align=right | 2.1 km || 
|-id=688 bgcolor=#E9E9E9
| 616688 Gaowei ||  ||  || September 29, 2016 || Xingming || X. Gao ||  || align=right | 1.2 km || 
|-id=689 bgcolor=#E9E9E9
| 616689 Yihangyiyang ||  ||  || November 1, 2016 || Xingming || G. Sun, X. Gao ||  || align=right | 1.4 km || 
|-id=690 bgcolor=#d6d6d6
| 616690 ||  || — || December 31, 2016 || Xingming || X. Gao ||  || align=right | 2.2 km || 
|-id=691 bgcolor=#d6d6d6
| 616691 ||  || — || January 29, 1995 || Kitt Peak || Spacewatch ||  || align=right | 1.8 km || 
|-id=692 bgcolor=#fefefe
| 616692 ||  || — || April 5, 1995 || Kitt Peak || Spacewatch ||  || align=right data-sort-value="0.55" | 550 m || 
|-id=693 bgcolor=#d6d6d6
| 616693 ||  || — || September 18, 1995 || Kitt Peak || Spacewatch ||  || align=right | 2.2 km || 
|-id=694 bgcolor=#E9E9E9
| 616694 ||  || — || September 24, 1995 || Kitt Peak || Spacewatch ||  || align=right | 1.5 km || 
|-id=695 bgcolor=#d6d6d6
| 616695 ||  || — || September 20, 1995 || Kitt Peak || Spacewatch ||  || align=right | 2.4 km || 
|-id=696 bgcolor=#E9E9E9
| 616696 ||  || — || October 19, 1995 || Kitt Peak || Spacewatch ||  || align=right data-sort-value="0.62" | 620 m || 
|-id=697 bgcolor=#E9E9E9
| 616697 ||  || — || October 21, 1995 || Kitt Peak || Spacewatch ||  || align=right | 1.7 km || 
|-id=698 bgcolor=#E9E9E9
| 616698 ||  || — || October 22, 1995 || Kitt Peak || Spacewatch ||  || align=right data-sort-value="0.97" | 970 m || 
|-id=699 bgcolor=#d6d6d6
| 616699 ||  || — || October 20, 1995 || Kitt Peak || Spacewatch ||  || align=right | 3.2 km || 
|-id=700 bgcolor=#d6d6d6
| 616700 ||  || — || October 20, 1995 || Kitt Peak || Spacewatch ||  || align=right | 1.8 km || 
|}

616701–616800 

|-bgcolor=#d6d6d6
| 616701 ||  || — || October 21, 1995 || Kitt Peak || Spacewatch ||  || align=right | 2.2 km || 
|-id=702 bgcolor=#d6d6d6
| 616702 ||  || — || November 19, 1995 || Kitt Peak || Spacewatch ||  || align=right | 3.0 km || 
|-id=703 bgcolor=#fefefe
| 616703 ||  || — || September 6, 1996 || Kitt Peak || Spacewatch ||  || align=right data-sort-value="0.46" | 460 m || 
|-id=704 bgcolor=#E9E9E9
| 616704 ||  || — || September 7, 1996 || Kitt Peak || Spacewatch ||  || align=right | 1.1 km || 
|-id=705 bgcolor=#d6d6d6
| 616705 ||  || — || November 10, 1996 || Kitt Peak || Spacewatch ||  || align=right | 2.5 km || 
|-id=706 bgcolor=#E9E9E9
| 616706 ||  || — || November 5, 1996 || Kitt Peak || Spacewatch ||  || align=right | 1.8 km || 
|-id=707 bgcolor=#fefefe
| 616707 ||  || — || November 10, 1996 || Kitt Peak || Spacewatch ||  || align=right data-sort-value="0.51" | 510 m || 
|-id=708 bgcolor=#d6d6d6
| 616708 ||  || — || January 2, 1997 || Kitt Peak || Spacewatch ||  || align=right | 2.4 km || 
|-id=709 bgcolor=#fefefe
| 616709 ||  || — || February 1, 1997 || Kitt Peak || Spacewatch ||  || align=right data-sort-value="0.85" | 850 m || 
|-id=710 bgcolor=#d6d6d6
| 616710 ||  || — || February 3, 1997 || Kitt Peak || Spacewatch ||  || align=right | 2.5 km || 
|-id=711 bgcolor=#d6d6d6
| 616711 ||  || — || March 10, 1997 || Kitt Peak || Spacewatch ||  || align=right | 2.9 km || 
|-id=712 bgcolor=#E9E9E9
| 616712 ||  || — || September 28, 1997 || Kitt Peak || Spacewatch ||  || align=right | 1.4 km || 
|-id=713 bgcolor=#d6d6d6
| 616713 ||  || — || September 29, 1997 || Kitt Peak || Spacewatch ||  || align=right | 2.5 km || 
|-id=714 bgcolor=#d6d6d6
| 616714 ||  || — || October 1, 1997 || Mauna Kea || C. Veillet ||  || align=right | 2.3 km || 
|-id=715 bgcolor=#E9E9E9
| 616715 ||  || — || November 1, 2006 || Mount Lemmon || Mount Lemmon Survey ||  || align=right | 1.3 km || 
|-id=716 bgcolor=#fefefe
| 616716 ||  || — || November 23, 1997 || Kitt Peak || Spacewatch ||  || align=right data-sort-value="0.60" | 600 m || 
|-id=717 bgcolor=#fefefe
| 616717 ||  || — || January 25, 1998 || Kitt Peak || Spacewatch ||  || align=right data-sort-value="0.75" | 750 m || 
|-id=718 bgcolor=#d6d6d6
| 616718 ||  || — || February 24, 1998 || Kitt Peak || Spacewatch ||  || align=right | 2.8 km || 
|-id=719 bgcolor=#fefefe
| 616719 ||  || — || September 15, 1998 || Kitt Peak || Spacewatch ||  || align=right data-sort-value="0.49" | 490 m || 
|-id=720 bgcolor=#d6d6d6
| 616720 ||  || — || September 19, 1998 || Apache Point || SDSS Collaboration ||  || align=right | 1.9 km || 
|-id=721 bgcolor=#E9E9E9
| 616721 ||  || — || August 28, 2002 || Palomar || NEAT ||  || align=right | 1.2 km || 
|-id=722 bgcolor=#E9E9E9
| 616722 ||  || — || March 23, 2004 || Kitt Peak || Spacewatch ||  || align=right | 1.2 km || 
|-id=723 bgcolor=#fefefe
| 616723 ||  || — || October 18, 2012 || Haleakala || Pan-STARRS ||  || align=right data-sort-value="0.51" | 510 m || 
|-id=724 bgcolor=#d6d6d6
| 616724 ||  || — || September 21, 2008 || Kitt Peak || Spacewatch ||  || align=right | 1.8 km || 
|-id=725 bgcolor=#d6d6d6
| 616725 ||  || — || November 14, 1998 || Kitt Peak || Spacewatch ||  || align=right | 1.9 km || 
|-id=726 bgcolor=#d6d6d6
| 616726 ||  || — || November 17, 1998 || La Palma || D. Davis, S. Howell ||  || align=right | 2.2 km || 
|-id=727 bgcolor=#E9E9E9
| 616727 ||  || — || December 11, 1998 || Kitt Peak || Spacewatch ||  || align=right | 1.5 km || 
|-id=728 bgcolor=#fefefe
| 616728 ||  || — || November 10, 2005 || Kitt Peak || Spacewatch ||  || align=right data-sort-value="0.73" | 730 m || 
|-id=729 bgcolor=#fefefe
| 616729 ||  || — || February 9, 2014 || Haleakala || Pan-STARRS ||  || align=right data-sort-value="0.67" | 670 m || 
|-id=730 bgcolor=#E9E9E9
| 616730 ||  || — || December 3, 2015 || Mount Lemmon || Mount Lemmon Survey ||  || align=right | 1.4 km || 
|-id=731 bgcolor=#d6d6d6
| 616731 ||  || — || January 22, 2015 || Haleakala || Pan-STARRS ||  || align=right | 2.0 km || 
|-id=732 bgcolor=#E9E9E9
| 616732 ||  || — || October 12, 2014 || Mount Lemmon || Mount Lemmon Survey ||  || align=right | 1.3 km || 
|-id=733 bgcolor=#d6d6d6
| 616733 ||  || — || March 21, 1999 || Apache Point || SDSS Collaboration ||  || align=right | 2.6 km || 
|-id=734 bgcolor=#E9E9E9
| 616734 ||  || — || April 4, 2008 || Mount Lemmon || Mount Lemmon Survey ||  || align=right | 1.6 km || 
|-id=735 bgcolor=#fefefe
| 616735 ||  || — || September 29, 2003 || Needville || Needville Obs. ||  || align=right data-sort-value="0.54" | 540 m || 
|-id=736 bgcolor=#E9E9E9
| 616736 ||  || — || October 1, 1999 || Kitt Peak || Spacewatch ||  || align=right | 2.4 km || 
|-id=737 bgcolor=#E9E9E9
| 616737 ||  || — || November 7, 2005 || Mauna Kea || Mauna Kea Obs. ||  || align=right | 1.9 km || 
|-id=738 bgcolor=#fefefe
| 616738 ||  || — || November 2, 1999 || Kitt Peak || Spacewatch ||  || align=right data-sort-value="0.52" | 520 m || 
|-id=739 bgcolor=#E9E9E9
| 616739 ||  || — || November 9, 1999 || Kitt Peak || Spacewatch ||  || align=right data-sort-value="0.99" | 990 m || 
|-id=740 bgcolor=#E9E9E9
| 616740 ||  || — || December 2, 1999 || Kitt Peak || Spacewatch ||  || align=right data-sort-value="0.79" | 790 m || 
|-id=741 bgcolor=#E9E9E9
| 616741 ||  || — || December 7, 1999 || Kitt Peak || Spacewatch ||  || align=right data-sort-value="0.76" | 760 m || 
|-id=742 bgcolor=#fefefe
| 616742 ||  || — || December 27, 1999 || Kitt Peak || Spacewatch ||  || align=right data-sort-value="0.64" | 640 m || 
|-id=743 bgcolor=#E9E9E9
| 616743 ||  || — || February 19, 2013 || Nogales || M. Schwartz, P. R. Holvorcem ||  || align=right data-sort-value="0.91" | 910 m || 
|-id=744 bgcolor=#d6d6d6
| 616744 ||  || — || January 28, 2000 || Kitt Peak || Spacewatch ||  || align=right | 2.0 km || 
|-id=745 bgcolor=#d6d6d6
| 616745 ||  || — || January 28, 2000 || Kitt Peak || Spacewatch ||  || align=right | 2.1 km || 
|-id=746 bgcolor=#d6d6d6
| 616746 ||  || — || February 11, 2000 || Kitt Peak || Spacewatch ||  || align=right | 2.2 km || 
|-id=747 bgcolor=#E9E9E9
| 616747 ||  || — || February 2, 2000 || Kitt Peak || Spacewatch ||  || align=right | 1.0 km || 
|-id=748 bgcolor=#d6d6d6
| 616748 ||  || — || February 4, 2000 || Kitt Peak || Spacewatch ||  || align=right | 2.6 km || 
|-id=749 bgcolor=#fefefe
| 616749 ||  || — || February 4, 2000 || Kitt Peak || Spacewatch ||  || align=right data-sort-value="0.62" | 620 m || 
|-id=750 bgcolor=#d6d6d6
| 616750 ||  || — || February 4, 2000 || Kitt Peak || Spacewatch ||  || align=right | 2.2 km || 
|-id=751 bgcolor=#fefefe
| 616751 ||  || — || February 27, 2000 || Kitt Peak || Spacewatch ||  || align=right data-sort-value="0.43" | 430 m || 
|-id=752 bgcolor=#E9E9E9
| 616752 ||  || — || March 3, 2000 || Kitt Peak || Spacewatch ||  || align=right | 1.2 km || 
|-id=753 bgcolor=#E9E9E9
| 616753 ||  || — || April 13, 2013 || Haleakala || Pan-STARRS ||  || align=right data-sort-value="0.72" | 720 m || 
|-id=754 bgcolor=#E9E9E9
| 616754 ||  || — || March 3, 2000 || Socorro || LINEAR ||  || align=right | 1.0 km || 
|-id=755 bgcolor=#fefefe
| 616755 ||  || — || May 6, 2011 || Kitt Peak || Spacewatch ||  || align=right data-sort-value="0.64" | 640 m || 
|-id=756 bgcolor=#fefefe
| 616756 ||  || — || February 17, 2007 || Kitt Peak || Spacewatch ||  || align=right data-sort-value="0.70" | 700 m || 
|-id=757 bgcolor=#E9E9E9
| 616757 ||  || — || January 16, 2004 || Kitt Peak || Spacewatch ||  || align=right | 1.3 km || 
|-id=758 bgcolor=#d6d6d6
| 616758 ||  || — || March 27, 2000 || Kitt Peak || Spacewatch ||  || align=right | 2.3 km || 
|-id=759 bgcolor=#E9E9E9
| 616759 ||  || — || March 27, 2000 || Kitt Peak || Spacewatch ||  || align=right data-sort-value="0.87" | 870 m || 
|-id=760 bgcolor=#E9E9E9
| 616760 ||  || — || March 27, 2000 || Kitt Peak || Spacewatch ||  || align=right | 1.2 km || 
|-id=761 bgcolor=#fefefe
| 616761 ||  || — || March 10, 2007 || Mount Lemmon || Mount Lemmon Survey ||  || align=right data-sort-value="0.64" | 640 m || 
|-id=762 bgcolor=#E9E9E9
| 616762 ||  || — || April 5, 2000 || Socorro || LINEAR ||  || align=right | 1.7 km || 
|-id=763 bgcolor=#E9E9E9
| 616763 ||  || — || January 2, 2012 || Mount Lemmon || Mount Lemmon Survey ||  || align=right | 1.2 km || 
|-id=764 bgcolor=#d6d6d6
| 616764 ||  || — || November 26, 2014 || Haleakala || Pan-STARRS ||  || align=right | 2.1 km || 
|-id=765 bgcolor=#fefefe
| 616765 ||  || — || October 2, 2013 || Haleakala || Pan-STARRS ||  || align=right data-sort-value="0.54" | 540 m || 
|-id=766 bgcolor=#fefefe
| 616766 ||  || — || May 8, 2011 || Mount Lemmon || Mount Lemmon Survey ||  || align=right data-sort-value="0.60" | 600 m || 
|-id=767 bgcolor=#fefefe
| 616767 ||  || — || April 13, 2000 || Kitt Peak || Spacewatch ||  || align=right data-sort-value="0.68" | 680 m || 
|-id=768 bgcolor=#fefefe
| 616768 ||  || — || April 24, 2000 || Kitt Peak || Spacewatch ||  || align=right data-sort-value="0.74" | 740 m || 
|-id=769 bgcolor=#E9E9E9
| 616769 ||  || — || April 29, 2000 || Socorro || LINEAR ||  || align=right | 1.9 km || 
|-id=770 bgcolor=#fefefe
| 616770 ||  || — || March 14, 2007 || Kitt Peak || Spacewatch ||  || align=right data-sort-value="0.70" | 700 m || 
|-id=771 bgcolor=#fefefe
| 616771 ||  || — || May 6, 2000 || Kitt Peak || Spacewatch ||  || align=right data-sort-value="0.76" | 760 m || 
|-id=772 bgcolor=#E9E9E9
| 616772 ||  || — || February 2, 2008 || Mount Lemmon || Mount Lemmon Survey ||  || align=right | 1.1 km || 
|-id=773 bgcolor=#d6d6d6
| 616773 ||  || — || April 14, 2016 || Haleakala || Pan-STARRS ||  || align=right | 2.1 km || 
|-id=774 bgcolor=#E9E9E9
| 616774 ||  || — || November 13, 2006 || Catalina || CSS ||  || align=right | 1.8 km || 
|-id=775 bgcolor=#fefefe
| 616775 ||  || — || June 5, 2011 || Nogales || M. Schwartz, P. R. Holvorcem ||  || align=right data-sort-value="0.68" | 680 m || 
|-id=776 bgcolor=#fefefe
| 616776 ||  || — || May 28, 2000 || Socorro || LINEAR ||  || align=right data-sort-value="0.80" | 800 m || 
|-id=777 bgcolor=#E9E9E9
| 616777 ||  || — || May 28, 2000 || Socorro || LINEAR ||  || align=right | 1.6 km || 
|-id=778 bgcolor=#fefefe
| 616778 ||  || — || May 28, 2000 || Kitt Peak || Spacewatch ||  || align=right data-sort-value="0.68" | 680 m || 
|-id=779 bgcolor=#fefefe
| 616779 ||  || — || April 18, 2007 || Catalina || CSS ||  || align=right data-sort-value="0.74" | 740 m || 
|-id=780 bgcolor=#E9E9E9
| 616780 ||  || — || October 9, 2005 || Kitt Peak || Spacewatch ||  || align=right | 1.6 km || 
|-id=781 bgcolor=#d6d6d6
| 616781 ||  || — || January 21, 2014 || Kitt Peak || Spacewatch ||  || align=right | 2.3 km || 
|-id=782 bgcolor=#C2FFFF
| 616782 ||  || — || September 27, 2000 || Kitt Peak || Spacewatch || L5 || align=right | 7.5 km || 
|-id=783 bgcolor=#fefefe
| 616783 ||  || — || August 30, 2000 || Kitt Peak || Spacewatch ||  || align=right data-sort-value="0.60" | 600 m || 
|-id=784 bgcolor=#fefefe
| 616784 ||  || — || May 24, 2006 || Kitt Peak || Spacewatch ||  || align=right data-sort-value="0.52" | 520 m || 
|-id=785 bgcolor=#fefefe
| 616785 ||  || — || September 13, 2013 || Mount Lemmon || Mount Lemmon Survey ||  || align=right data-sort-value="0.53" | 530 m || 
|-id=786 bgcolor=#fefefe
| 616786 ||  || — || September 10, 2004 || Kitt Peak || Spacewatch ||  || align=right data-sort-value="0.59" | 590 m || 
|-id=787 bgcolor=#E9E9E9
| 616787 ||  || — || August 28, 2000 || Cerro Tololo || R. Millis, L. H. Wasserman ||  || align=right | 1.6 km || 
|-id=788 bgcolor=#C2FFFF
| 616788 ||  || — || December 18, 2015 || Mount Lemmon || Mount Lemmon Survey || L5 || align=right | 6.8 km || 
|-id=789 bgcolor=#fefefe
| 616789 ||  || — || July 27, 2011 || Haleakala || Pan-STARRS ||  || align=right data-sort-value="0.64" | 640 m || 
|-id=790 bgcolor=#fefefe
| 616790 ||  || — || March 24, 2014 || Haleakala || Pan-STARRS ||  || align=right data-sort-value="0.62" | 620 m || 
|-id=791 bgcolor=#fefefe
| 616791 ||  || — || October 8, 2008 || Kitt Peak || Spacewatch ||  || align=right data-sort-value="0.79" | 790 m || 
|-id=792 bgcolor=#E9E9E9
| 616792 ||  || — || August 15, 2009 || Kitt Peak || Spacewatch ||  || align=right | 1.8 km || 
|-id=793 bgcolor=#fefefe
| 616793 ||  || — || September 24, 2000 || Socorro || LINEAR ||  || align=right data-sort-value="0.78" | 780 m || 
|-id=794 bgcolor=#E9E9E9
| 616794 ||  || — || September 27, 2000 || Socorro || LINEAR ||  || align=right data-sort-value="0.73" | 730 m || 
|-id=795 bgcolor=#d6d6d6
| 616795 ||  || — || September 8, 2000 || Kitt Peak || Spacewatch ||  || align=right | 2.1 km || 
|-id=796 bgcolor=#d6d6d6
| 616796 ||  || — || September 26, 2000 || Kitt Peak || Spacewatch ||  || align=right | 3.8 km || 
|-id=797 bgcolor=#d6d6d6
| 616797 ||  || — || September 28, 2000 || Socorro || LINEAR ||  || align=right | 3.1 km || 
|-id=798 bgcolor=#fefefe
| 616798 ||  || — || August 25, 2003 || Cerro Tololo || Cerro Tololo Obs. ||  || align=right data-sort-value="0.70" | 700 m || 
|-id=799 bgcolor=#E9E9E9
| 616799 ||  || — || November 23, 2014 || Mount Lemmon || Mount Lemmon Survey ||  || align=right | 1.9 km || 
|-id=800 bgcolor=#E9E9E9
| 616800 ||  || — || September 25, 2009 || Mount Lemmon || Mount Lemmon Survey ||  || align=right | 1.7 km || 
|}

616801–616900 

|-bgcolor=#E9E9E9
| 616801 ||  || — || October 28, 2014 || Haleakala || Pan-STARRS ||  || align=right | 2.1 km || 
|-id=802 bgcolor=#C2FFFF
| 616802 ||  || — || April 6, 2008 || Kitt Peak || Spacewatch || L5 || align=right | 7.9 km || 
|-id=803 bgcolor=#C2FFFF
| 616803 ||  || — || November 26, 2014 || Haleakala || Pan-STARRS || L5 || align=right | 7.2 km || 
|-id=804 bgcolor=#fefefe
| 616804 ||  || — || April 4, 2014 || Mount Lemmon || Mount Lemmon Survey ||  || align=right data-sort-value="0.69" | 690 m || 
|-id=805 bgcolor=#fefefe
| 616805 ||  || — || November 2, 2010 || Mount Lemmon || Mount Lemmon Survey ||  || align=right data-sort-value="0.61" | 610 m || 
|-id=806 bgcolor=#d6d6d6
| 616806 ||  || — || November 26, 2012 || Mount Lemmon || Mount Lemmon Survey ||  || align=right | 2.5 km || 
|-id=807 bgcolor=#C2FFFF
| 616807 ||  || — || October 8, 2012 || Mount Lemmon || Mount Lemmon Survey || L5 || align=right | 6.6 km || 
|-id=808 bgcolor=#fefefe
| 616808 ||  || — || October 10, 2010 || Mount Lemmon || Mount Lemmon Survey ||  || align=right data-sort-value="0.59" | 590 m || 
|-id=809 bgcolor=#fefefe
| 616809 ||  || — || June 20, 2015 || Haleakala || Pan-STARRS ||  || align=right data-sort-value="0.72" | 720 m || 
|-id=810 bgcolor=#E9E9E9
| 616810 ||  || — || November 26, 2000 || Kitt Peak || Spacewatch ||  || align=right | 2.5 km || 
|-id=811 bgcolor=#fefefe
| 616811 ||  || — || April 25, 2015 || Haleakala || Pan-STARRS ||  || align=right data-sort-value="0.57" | 570 m || 
|-id=812 bgcolor=#fefefe
| 616812 ||  || — || November 17, 2004 || Campo Imperatore || CINEOS ||  || align=right data-sort-value="0.87" | 870 m || 
|-id=813 bgcolor=#d6d6d6
| 616813 ||  || — || August 1, 2017 || Haleakala || Pan-STARRS ||  || align=right | 3.1 km || 
|-id=814 bgcolor=#fefefe
| 616814 ||  || — || December 9, 2010 || Kitt Peak || Spacewatch ||  || align=right data-sort-value="0.65" | 650 m || 
|-id=815 bgcolor=#fefefe
| 616815 ||  || — || March 4, 2008 || Kitt Peak || Spacewatch ||  || align=right data-sort-value="0.60" | 600 m || 
|-id=816 bgcolor=#fefefe
| 616816 ||  || — || December 20, 2000 || Kitt Peak || Spacewatch ||  || align=right data-sort-value="0.47" | 470 m || 
|-id=817 bgcolor=#E9E9E9
| 616817 ||  || — || January 17, 2001 || Haleakala || AMOS ||  || align=right | 1.3 km || 
|-id=818 bgcolor=#d6d6d6
| 616818 ||  || — || September 20, 2014 || Haleakala || Pan-STARRS ||  || align=right | 2.0 km || 
|-id=819 bgcolor=#E9E9E9
| 616819 ||  || — || January 25, 2009 || Kitt Peak || Spacewatch ||  || align=right data-sort-value="0.75" | 750 m || 
|-id=820 bgcolor=#fefefe
| 616820 ||  || — || August 14, 2012 || Siding Spring || SSS ||  || align=right data-sort-value="0.69" | 690 m || 
|-id=821 bgcolor=#E9E9E9
| 616821 ||  || — || March 27, 2001 || Cerro Tololo || A. C. Becker ||  || align=right data-sort-value="0.72" | 720 m || 
|-id=822 bgcolor=#E9E9E9
| 616822 ||  || — || March 22, 2001 || Kitt Peak || Spacewatch ||  || align=right data-sort-value="0.77" | 770 m || 
|-id=823 bgcolor=#E9E9E9
| 616823 ||  || — || September 28, 2003 || Kitt Peak || Spacewatch ||  || align=right data-sort-value="0.62" | 620 m || 
|-id=824 bgcolor=#fefefe
| 616824 ||  || — || March 22, 2001 || Kitt Peak || Kitt Peak Obs. ||  || align=right data-sort-value="0.44" | 440 m || 
|-id=825 bgcolor=#d6d6d6
| 616825 ||  || — || February 27, 2006 || Mount Lemmon || Mount Lemmon Survey ||  || align=right | 1.9 km || 
|-id=826 bgcolor=#E9E9E9
| 616826 ||  || — || May 8, 2014 || Haleakala || Pan-STARRS ||  || align=right data-sort-value="0.92" | 920 m || 
|-id=827 bgcolor=#fefefe
| 616827 ||  || — || April 7, 2008 || Kitt Peak || Spacewatch ||  || align=right data-sort-value="0.68" | 680 m || 
|-id=828 bgcolor=#fefefe
| 616828 ||  || — || March 27, 2018 || Mount Lemmon || Mount Lemmon Survey ||  || align=right data-sort-value="0.74" | 740 m || 
|-id=829 bgcolor=#fefefe
| 616829 ||  || — || January 17, 2013 || Haleakala || Pan-STARRS || H || align=right data-sort-value="0.50" | 500 m || 
|-id=830 bgcolor=#fefefe
| 616830 ||  || — || July 18, 2005 || Palomar || NEAT ||  || align=right data-sort-value="0.78" | 780 m || 
|-id=831 bgcolor=#E9E9E9
| 616831 ||  || — || December 9, 2015 || Haleakala || Pan-STARRS ||  || align=right data-sort-value="0.97" | 970 m || 
|-id=832 bgcolor=#E9E9E9
| 616832 ||  || — || April 8, 2013 || Haleakala || Pan-STARRS ||  || align=right | 1.3 km || 
|-id=833 bgcolor=#d6d6d6
| 616833 ||  || — || May 22, 2001 || Cerro Tololo || J. L. Elliot, L. H. Wasserman ||  || align=right | 1.9 km || 
|-id=834 bgcolor=#fefefe
| 616834 ||  || — || June 30, 2001 || Palomar || NEAT ||  || align=right data-sort-value="0.84" | 840 m || 
|-id=835 bgcolor=#FA8072
| 616835 ||  || — || July 12, 2001 || Palomar || NEAT ||  || align=right | 2.1 km || 
|-id=836 bgcolor=#E9E9E9
| 616836 ||  || — || July 18, 2001 || Palomar || NEAT ||  || align=right | 1.1 km || 
|-id=837 bgcolor=#E9E9E9
| 616837 ||  || — || August 14, 2001 || Palomar || NEAT ||  || align=right | 1.2 km || 
|-id=838 bgcolor=#E9E9E9
| 616838 ||  || — || August 14, 2001 || Haleakala || AMOS ||  || align=right | 1.6 km || 
|-id=839 bgcolor=#fefefe
| 616839 ||  || — || August 15, 2001 || Haleakala || AMOS ||  || align=right data-sort-value="0.72" | 720 m || 
|-id=840 bgcolor=#fefefe
| 616840 ||  || — || August 22, 2001 || Kitt Peak || Spacewatch ||  || align=right data-sort-value="0.53" | 530 m || 
|-id=841 bgcolor=#fefefe
| 616841 ||  || — || August 24, 2001 || Socorro || LINEAR || H || align=right data-sort-value="0.76" | 760 m || 
|-id=842 bgcolor=#fefefe
| 616842 ||  || — || August 17, 2001 || Socorro || LINEAR ||  || align=right data-sort-value="0.69" | 690 m || 
|-id=843 bgcolor=#E9E9E9
| 616843 ||  || — || August 17, 2001 || Palomar || NEAT ||  || align=right | 1.4 km || 
|-id=844 bgcolor=#E9E9E9
| 616844 ||  || — || August 25, 2001 || Socorro || LINEAR ||  || align=right | 1.2 km || 
|-id=845 bgcolor=#fefefe
| 616845 ||  || — || August 20, 2001 || Pic du Midi || Pic du Midi Obs. ||  || align=right data-sort-value="0.57" | 570 m || 
|-id=846 bgcolor=#fefefe
| 616846 ||  || — || August 19, 2001 || Socorro || LINEAR ||  || align=right data-sort-value="0.67" | 670 m || 
|-id=847 bgcolor=#d6d6d6
| 616847 ||  || — || August 17, 2001 || Palomar || NEAT ||  || align=right | 2.5 km || 
|-id=848 bgcolor=#E9E9E9
| 616848 ||  || — || August 19, 2001 || Cerro Tololo || Cerro Tololo Obs. ||  || align=right data-sort-value="0.92" | 920 m || 
|-id=849 bgcolor=#fefefe
| 616849 ||  || — || October 9, 2008 || Kitt Peak || Spacewatch ||  || align=right data-sort-value="0.55" | 550 m || 
|-id=850 bgcolor=#E9E9E9
| 616850 ||  || — || July 1, 2014 || Mount Lemmon || Mount Lemmon Survey ||  || align=right | 1.5 km || 
|-id=851 bgcolor=#fefefe
| 616851 ||  || — || August 23, 2001 || Anderson Mesa || LONEOS ||  || align=right data-sort-value="0.65" | 650 m || 
|-id=852 bgcolor=#fefefe
| 616852 ||  || — || December 10, 2005 || Kitt Peak || Spacewatch ||  || align=right data-sort-value="0.66" | 660 m || 
|-id=853 bgcolor=#E9E9E9
| 616853 ||  || — || August 24, 2001 || Kitt Peak || Spacewatch ||  || align=right | 1.3 km || 
|-id=854 bgcolor=#fefefe
| 616854 ||  || — || September 9, 2001 || Palomar || NEAT ||  || align=right data-sort-value="0.81" | 810 m || 
|-id=855 bgcolor=#fefefe
| 616855 ||  || — || September 12, 2001 || Socorro || LINEAR ||  || align=right data-sort-value="0.76" | 760 m || 
|-id=856 bgcolor=#d6d6d6
| 616856 ||  || — || August 12, 2001 || Palomar || NEAT ||  || align=right | 3.1 km || 
|-id=857 bgcolor=#fefefe
| 616857 ||  || — || May 26, 2011 || Mount Lemmon || Mount Lemmon Survey ||  || align=right data-sort-value="0.84" | 840 m || 
|-id=858 bgcolor=#E9E9E9
| 616858 ||  || — || September 14, 2001 || Palomar || NEAT ||  || align=right | 1.3 km || 
|-id=859 bgcolor=#E9E9E9
| 616859 ||  || — || September 12, 2001 || Kitt Peak || Spacewatch ||  || align=right | 1.3 km || 
|-id=860 bgcolor=#E9E9E9
| 616860 ||  || — || August 23, 2001 || Anderson Mesa || LONEOS ||  || align=right | 1.2 km || 
|-id=861 bgcolor=#d6d6d6
| 616861 ||  || — || September 19, 2001 || Socorro || LINEAR ||  || align=right | 2.5 km || 
|-id=862 bgcolor=#fefefe
| 616862 ||  || — || August 24, 2001 || Socorro || LINEAR ||  || align=right data-sort-value="0.63" | 630 m || 
|-id=863 bgcolor=#E9E9E9
| 616863 ||  || — || September 19, 2001 || Socorro || LINEAR ||  || align=right | 1.0 km || 
|-id=864 bgcolor=#fefefe
| 616864 ||  || — || September 20, 2001 || Socorro || LINEAR ||  || align=right data-sort-value="0.69" | 690 m || 
|-id=865 bgcolor=#fefefe
| 616865 ||  || — || September 21, 2001 || Socorro || LINEAR ||  || align=right data-sort-value="0.80" | 800 m || 
|-id=866 bgcolor=#E9E9E9
| 616866 ||  || — || September 21, 2001 || Socorro || LINEAR ||  || align=right | 1.1 km || 
|-id=867 bgcolor=#fefefe
| 616867 ||  || — || March 16, 2007 || Mount Lemmon || Mount Lemmon Survey ||  || align=right data-sort-value="0.64" | 640 m || 
|-id=868 bgcolor=#fefefe
| 616868 ||  || — || October 10, 2001 || Palomar || NEAT ||  || align=right data-sort-value="0.81" | 810 m || 
|-id=869 bgcolor=#E9E9E9
| 616869 ||  || — || October 10, 2001 || Palomar || NEAT ||  || align=right | 1.1 km || 
|-id=870 bgcolor=#E9E9E9
| 616870 ||  || — || October 14, 2001 || Kitt Peak || Spacewatch ||  || align=right | 1.8 km || 
|-id=871 bgcolor=#E9E9E9
| 616871 ||  || — || October 11, 2001 || Socorro || LINEAR ||  || align=right | 1.6 km || 
|-id=872 bgcolor=#fefefe
| 616872 ||  || — || October 15, 2001 || Palomar || NEAT ||  || align=right data-sort-value="0.81" | 810 m || 
|-id=873 bgcolor=#E9E9E9
| 616873 ||  || — || October 15, 2001 || Kitt Peak || Spacewatch ||  || align=right | 1.5 km || 
|-id=874 bgcolor=#E9E9E9
| 616874 ||  || — || April 6, 2008 || Mount Lemmon || Mount Lemmon Survey ||  || align=right | 2.0 km || 
|-id=875 bgcolor=#d6d6d6
| 616875 ||  || — || January 28, 2003 || Apache Point || SDSS Collaboration ||  || align=right | 2.2 km || 
|-id=876 bgcolor=#E9E9E9
| 616876 ||  || — || October 18, 2001 || Palomar || NEAT ||  || align=right | 1.1 km || 
|-id=877 bgcolor=#E9E9E9
| 616877 ||  || — || October 23, 2001 || Palomar || NEAT ||  || align=right | 2.2 km || 
|-id=878 bgcolor=#E9E9E9
| 616878 ||  || — || October 10, 2001 || Palomar || NEAT ||  || align=right | 1.3 km || 
|-id=879 bgcolor=#fefefe
| 616879 ||  || — || October 14, 2001 || Kitt Peak || Spacewatch ||  || align=right data-sort-value="0.78" | 780 m || 
|-id=880 bgcolor=#E9E9E9
| 616880 ||  || — || December 8, 2015 || Mount Lemmon || Mount Lemmon Survey ||  || align=right | 1.5 km || 
|-id=881 bgcolor=#C2FFFF
| 616881 ||  || — || October 4, 2013 || Mount Lemmon || Mount Lemmon Survey || L5 || align=right | 11 km || 
|-id=882 bgcolor=#C2FFFF
| 616882 ||  || — || September 18, 2012 || Mount Lemmon || Mount Lemmon Survey || L5 || align=right | 6.3 km || 
|-id=883 bgcolor=#fefefe
| 616883 ||  || — || September 17, 2001 || Anderson Mesa || LONEOS ||  || align=right data-sort-value="0.88" | 880 m || 
|-id=884 bgcolor=#E9E9E9
| 616884 ||  || — || September 23, 2001 || Kitt Peak || Spacewatch ||  || align=right | 1.1 km || 
|-id=885 bgcolor=#fefefe
| 616885 ||  || — || October 18, 2001 || Palomar || NEAT ||  || align=right data-sort-value="0.67" | 670 m || 
|-id=886 bgcolor=#d6d6d6
| 616886 ||  || — || October 10, 2001 || Palomar || NEAT ||  || align=right | 2.6 km || 
|-id=887 bgcolor=#fefefe
| 616887 ||  || — || December 5, 2005 || Kitt Peak || Spacewatch ||  || align=right data-sort-value="0.68" | 680 m || 
|-id=888 bgcolor=#E9E9E9
| 616888 ||  || — || October 10, 2001 || Palomar || NEAT ||  || align=right | 1.3 km || 
|-id=889 bgcolor=#E9E9E9
| 616889 ||  || — || November 11, 2001 || Kitt Peak || Spacewatch ||  || align=right | 1.7 km || 
|-id=890 bgcolor=#C2FFFF
| 616890 ||  || — || October 23, 2013 || Mount Lemmon || Mount Lemmon Survey || L5 || align=right | 7.9 km || 
|-id=891 bgcolor=#fefefe
| 616891 ||  || — || September 28, 2008 || Mount Lemmon || Mount Lemmon Survey ||  || align=right data-sort-value="0.58" | 580 m || 
|-id=892 bgcolor=#d6d6d6
| 616892 ||  || — || August 19, 2006 || Kitt Peak || Spacewatch ||  || align=right | 2.1 km || 
|-id=893 bgcolor=#fefefe
| 616893 ||  || — || November 24, 2012 || Kitt Peak || Spacewatch ||  || align=right data-sort-value="0.62" | 620 m || 
|-id=894 bgcolor=#E9E9E9
| 616894 ||  || — || October 17, 2010 || Mount Lemmon || Mount Lemmon Survey ||  || align=right | 1.9 km || 
|-id=895 bgcolor=#fefefe
| 616895 ||  || — || October 27, 2008 || Mount Lemmon || Mount Lemmon Survey ||  || align=right data-sort-value="0.90" | 900 m || 
|-id=896 bgcolor=#C2FFFF
| 616896 ||  || — || November 21, 2014 || Haleakala || Pan-STARRS || L5 || align=right | 6.0 km || 
|-id=897 bgcolor=#E9E9E9
| 616897 ||  || — || November 10, 2010 || Mount Lemmon || Mount Lemmon Survey ||  || align=right | 1.8 km || 
|-id=898 bgcolor=#C2FFFF
| 616898 ||  || — || October 15, 2012 || Mount Lemmon || Mount Lemmon Survey || L5 || align=right | 8.2 km || 
|-id=899 bgcolor=#E9E9E9
| 616899 ||  || — || September 1, 2005 || Kitt Peak || Spacewatch ||  || align=right | 1.5 km || 
|-id=900 bgcolor=#fefefe
| 616900 ||  || — || August 23, 2008 || Kitt Peak || Spacewatch ||  || align=right data-sort-value="0.65" | 650 m || 
|}

616901–617000 

|-bgcolor=#fefefe
| 616901 ||  || — || October 25, 2001 || Apache Point || SDSS Collaboration ||  || align=right data-sort-value="0.62" | 620 m || 
|-id=902 bgcolor=#fefefe
| 616902 ||  || — || June 17, 2015 || Haleakala || Pan-STARRS ||  || align=right data-sort-value="0.59" | 590 m || 
|-id=903 bgcolor=#fefefe
| 616903 ||  || — || October 25, 2001 || Apache Point || SDSS Collaboration ||  || align=right data-sort-value="0.45" | 450 m || 
|-id=904 bgcolor=#d6d6d6
| 616904 ||  || — || October 25, 2001 || Apache Point || SDSS Collaboration ||  || align=right | 1.9 km || 
|-id=905 bgcolor=#E9E9E9
| 616905 ||  || — || November 15, 2001 || Kitt Peak || Spacewatch ||  || align=right | 1.4 km || 
|-id=906 bgcolor=#fefefe
| 616906 ||  || — || November 12, 2001 || Socorro || LINEAR || H || align=right data-sort-value="0.64" | 640 m || 
|-id=907 bgcolor=#d6d6d6
| 616907 ||  || — || October 22, 2012 || Mount Lemmon || Mount Lemmon Survey ||  || align=right | 2.5 km || 
|-id=908 bgcolor=#d6d6d6
| 616908 ||  || — || January 4, 2003 || Kitt Peak || Spacewatch ||  || align=right | 2.7 km || 
|-id=909 bgcolor=#d6d6d6
| 616909 ||  || — || November 12, 2001 || Apache Point || SDSS Collaboration ||  || align=right | 2.2 km || 
|-id=910 bgcolor=#fefefe
| 616910 ||  || — || November 18, 2001 || Socorro || LINEAR ||  || align=right data-sort-value="0.71" | 710 m || 
|-id=911 bgcolor=#d6d6d6
| 616911 ||  || — || November 20, 2001 || Socorro || LINEAR ||  || align=right | 3.2 km || 
|-id=912 bgcolor=#fefefe
| 616912 ||  || — || November 20, 2001 || Socorro || LINEAR ||  || align=right data-sort-value="0.73" | 730 m || 
|-id=913 bgcolor=#fefefe
| 616913 ||  || — || October 21, 2012 || Haleakala || Pan-STARRS ||  || align=right data-sort-value="0.71" | 710 m || 
|-id=914 bgcolor=#fefefe
| 616914 ||  || — || December 14, 2001 || Socorro || LINEAR ||  || align=right | 1.0 km || 
|-id=915 bgcolor=#E9E9E9
| 616915 ||  || — || December 3, 2010 || Mount Lemmon || Mount Lemmon Survey ||  || align=right | 1.7 km || 
|-id=916 bgcolor=#fefefe
| 616916 ||  || — || August 30, 2008 || La Sagra || OAM Obs. ||  || align=right data-sort-value="0.67" | 670 m || 
|-id=917 bgcolor=#E9E9E9
| 616917 ||  || — || November 19, 2001 || Kitt Peak || Spacewatch ||  || align=right | 2.0 km || 
|-id=918 bgcolor=#d6d6d6
| 616918 ||  || — || December 18, 2001 || Socorro || LINEAR ||  || align=right | 2.7 km || 
|-id=919 bgcolor=#d6d6d6
| 616919 ||  || — || December 18, 2001 || Socorro || LINEAR ||  || align=right | 2.7 km || 
|-id=920 bgcolor=#d6d6d6
| 616920 ||  || — || December 18, 2001 || Socorro || LINEAR ||  || align=right | 3.1 km || 
|-id=921 bgcolor=#d6d6d6
| 616921 ||  || — || December 18, 2001 || Socorro || LINEAR ||  || align=right | 3.6 km || 
|-id=922 bgcolor=#fefefe
| 616922 ||  || — || December 14, 2001 || Kitt Peak || Spacewatch ||  || align=right data-sort-value="0.83" | 830 m || 
|-id=923 bgcolor=#fefefe
| 616923 ||  || — || December 17, 2001 || Socorro || LINEAR || H || align=right data-sort-value="0.64" | 640 m || 
|-id=924 bgcolor=#fefefe
| 616924 ||  || — || August 20, 2004 || Kitt Peak || Spacewatch ||  || align=right data-sort-value="0.75" | 750 m || 
|-id=925 bgcolor=#d6d6d6
| 616925 ||  || — || January 26, 2014 || Haleakala || Pan-STARRS ||  || align=right | 2.6 km || 
|-id=926 bgcolor=#C2FFFF
| 616926 ||  || — || March 30, 2008 || Kitt Peak || Spacewatch || L5 || align=right | 8.3 km || 
|-id=927 bgcolor=#fefefe
| 616927 ||  || — || May 25, 2007 || Mount Lemmon || Mount Lemmon Survey ||  || align=right data-sort-value="0.74" | 740 m || 
|-id=928 bgcolor=#E9E9E9
| 616928 ||  || — || January 5, 2002 || Palomar || NEAT ||  || align=right | 2.1 km || 
|-id=929 bgcolor=#fefefe
| 616929 ||  || — || December 21, 2001 || Kitt Peak || Spacewatch ||  || align=right data-sort-value="0.73" | 730 m || 
|-id=930 bgcolor=#fefefe
| 616930 ||  || — || July 1, 2013 || Haleakala || Pan-STARRS ||  || align=right data-sort-value="0.52" | 520 m || 
|-id=931 bgcolor=#d6d6d6
| 616931 ||  || — || May 13, 2009 || Mount Lemmon || Mount Lemmon Survey ||  || align=right | 2.7 km || 
|-id=932 bgcolor=#d6d6d6
| 616932 ||  || — || April 11, 2010 || Mount Lemmon || Mount Lemmon Survey ||  || align=right | 3.4 km || 
|-id=933 bgcolor=#d6d6d6
| 616933 ||  || — || January 19, 2002 || Kitt Peak || Spacewatch ||  || align=right | 3.2 km || 
|-id=934 bgcolor=#d6d6d6
| 616934 ||  || — || January 15, 2008 || Mount Lemmon || Mount Lemmon Survey ||  || align=right | 3.6 km || 
|-id=935 bgcolor=#fefefe
| 616935 ||  || — || November 9, 2016 || Mount Lemmon || Mount Lemmon Survey ||  || align=right data-sort-value="0.77" | 770 m || 
|-id=936 bgcolor=#FA8072
| 616936 ||  || — || February 7, 2002 || Socorro || LINEAR ||  || align=right data-sort-value="0.97" | 970 m || 
|-id=937 bgcolor=#d6d6d6
| 616937 ||  || — || January 15, 2002 || Haleakala || AMOS ||  || align=right | 3.6 km || 
|-id=938 bgcolor=#d6d6d6
| 616938 ||  || — || November 23, 2006 || Mount Lemmon || Mount Lemmon Survey ||  || align=right | 4.5 km || 
|-id=939 bgcolor=#d6d6d6
| 616939 ||  || — || August 31, 2005 || Kitt Peak || Spacewatch ||  || align=right | 2.7 km || 
|-id=940 bgcolor=#d6d6d6
| 616940 ||  || — || February 3, 2008 || Kitt Peak || Spacewatch ||  || align=right | 2.7 km || 
|-id=941 bgcolor=#fefefe
| 616941 ||  || — || July 24, 2003 || Palomar || NEAT ||  || align=right data-sort-value="0.75" | 750 m || 
|-id=942 bgcolor=#fefefe
| 616942 ||  || — || November 3, 2008 || Mount Lemmon || Mount Lemmon Survey ||  || align=right data-sort-value="0.89" | 890 m || 
|-id=943 bgcolor=#fefefe
| 616943 ||  || — || May 4, 2014 || Kitt Peak || Spacewatch ||  || align=right data-sort-value="0.66" | 660 m || 
|-id=944 bgcolor=#fefefe
| 616944 ||  || — || March 21, 2015 || Haleakala || Pan-STARRS ||  || align=right data-sort-value="0.45" | 450 m || 
|-id=945 bgcolor=#d6d6d6
| 616945 ||  || — || August 24, 2017 || Haleakala || Pan-STARRS || Tj (2.99) || align=right | 2.6 km || 
|-id=946 bgcolor=#fefefe
| 616946 ||  || — || March 10, 2002 || Kitt Peak || Spacewatch ||  || align=right data-sort-value="0.69" | 690 m || 
|-id=947 bgcolor=#fefefe
| 616947 ||  || — || January 19, 2005 || Kitt Peak || Spacewatch ||  || align=right data-sort-value="0.53" | 530 m || 
|-id=948 bgcolor=#fefefe
| 616948 ||  || — || October 3, 2010 || Kitt Peak || Spacewatch ||  || align=right data-sort-value="0.47" | 470 m || 
|-id=949 bgcolor=#fefefe
| 616949 ||  || — || September 22, 2003 || Kitt Peak || Spacewatch ||  || align=right data-sort-value="0.77" | 770 m || 
|-id=950 bgcolor=#fefefe
| 616950 ||  || — || May 8, 2006 || Kitt Peak || Spacewatch ||  || align=right data-sort-value="0.87" | 870 m || 
|-id=951 bgcolor=#fefefe
| 616951 ||  || — || January 15, 2008 || Mount Lemmon || Mount Lemmon Survey ||  || align=right data-sort-value="0.61" | 610 m || 
|-id=952 bgcolor=#d6d6d6
| 616952 ||  || — || February 11, 2008 || Mount Lemmon || Mount Lemmon Survey ||  || align=right | 2.9 km || 
|-id=953 bgcolor=#fefefe
| 616953 ||  || — || February 28, 2008 || Mount Lemmon || Mount Lemmon Survey ||  || align=right data-sort-value="0.55" | 550 m || 
|-id=954 bgcolor=#fefefe
| 616954 ||  || — || April 13, 2002 || Kitt Peak || Spacewatch ||  || align=right data-sort-value="0.69" | 690 m || 
|-id=955 bgcolor=#fefefe
| 616955 ||  || — || September 30, 2006 || Mount Lemmon || Mount Lemmon Survey ||  || align=right data-sort-value="0.51" | 510 m || 
|-id=956 bgcolor=#d6d6d6
| 616956 ||  || — || November 16, 2009 || Mount Lemmon || Mount Lemmon Survey ||  || align=right | 2.0 km || 
|-id=957 bgcolor=#fefefe
| 616957 ||  || — || August 21, 2009 || La Sagra || OAM Obs. ||  || align=right data-sort-value="0.78" | 780 m || 
|-id=958 bgcolor=#E9E9E9
| 616958 ||  || — || June 2, 2002 || Palomar || NEAT ||  || align=right | 1.5 km || 
|-id=959 bgcolor=#E9E9E9
| 616959 ||  || — || July 10, 2002 || Campo Imperatore || CINEOS ||  || align=right | 1.0 km || 
|-id=960 bgcolor=#d6d6d6
| 616960 ||  || — || December 9, 2015 || Haleakala || Pan-STARRS ||  || align=right | 3.0 km || 
|-id=961 bgcolor=#fefefe
| 616961 ||  || — || October 15, 2009 || Mount Lemmon || Mount Lemmon Survey ||  || align=right data-sort-value="0.58" | 580 m || 
|-id=962 bgcolor=#fefefe
| 616962 ||  || — || February 10, 2011 || Mount Lemmon || Mount Lemmon Survey ||  || align=right data-sort-value="0.59" | 590 m || 
|-id=963 bgcolor=#E9E9E9
| 616963 ||  || — || July 9, 2002 || Socorro || LINEAR ||  || align=right | 1.3 km || 
|-id=964 bgcolor=#d6d6d6
| 616964 ||  || — || July 20, 2002 || Palomar || NEAT ||  || align=right | 2.2 km || 
|-id=965 bgcolor=#fefefe
| 616965 ||  || — || December 13, 2006 || Mount Lemmon || Mount Lemmon Survey ||  || align=right data-sort-value="0.60" | 600 m || 
|-id=966 bgcolor=#E9E9E9
| 616966 ||  || — || July 5, 2002 || Kitt Peak || Spacewatch ||  || align=right data-sort-value="0.71" | 710 m || 
|-id=967 bgcolor=#E9E9E9
| 616967 ||  || — || July 9, 2002 || Palomar || NEAT ||  || align=right data-sort-value="0.74" | 740 m || 
|-id=968 bgcolor=#E9E9E9
| 616968 ||  || — || January 11, 2008 || Kitt Peak || Spacewatch ||  || align=right data-sort-value="0.94" | 940 m || 
|-id=969 bgcolor=#d6d6d6
| 616969 ||  || — || June 24, 2007 || Kitt Peak || Spacewatch ||  || align=right | 3.2 km || 
|-id=970 bgcolor=#E9E9E9
| 616970 ||  || — || August 5, 2002 || Palomar || NEAT ||  || align=right data-sort-value="0.65" | 650 m || 
|-id=971 bgcolor=#fefefe
| 616971 ||  || — || September 15, 2009 || Kitt Peak || Spacewatch ||  || align=right data-sort-value="0.56" | 560 m || 
|-id=972 bgcolor=#d6d6d6
| 616972 ||  || — || April 5, 2011 || Mount Lemmon || Mount Lemmon Survey ||  || align=right | 2.4 km || 
|-id=973 bgcolor=#fefefe
| 616973 ||  || — || April 2, 2005 || Kitt Peak || Spacewatch ||  || align=right data-sort-value="0.72" | 720 m || 
|-id=974 bgcolor=#E9E9E9
| 616974 ||  || — || August 5, 2002 || Palomar || NEAT ||  || align=right data-sort-value="0.76" | 760 m || 
|-id=975 bgcolor=#E9E9E9
| 616975 ||  || — || August 13, 2002 || Anderson Mesa || LONEOS ||  || align=right | 1.3 km || 
|-id=976 bgcolor=#E9E9E9
| 616976 ||  || — || July 2, 2014 || Kitt Peak || Spacewatch ||  || align=right data-sort-value="0.83" | 830 m || 
|-id=977 bgcolor=#fefefe
| 616977 ||  || — || July 13, 2002 || Haleakala || AMOS ||  || align=right data-sort-value="0.92" | 920 m || 
|-id=978 bgcolor=#fefefe
| 616978 ||  || — || June 20, 2002 || Palomar || NEAT || H || align=right data-sort-value="0.60" | 600 m || 
|-id=979 bgcolor=#E9E9E9
| 616979 ||  || — || July 21, 2002 || Palomar || NEAT ||  || align=right data-sort-value="0.77" | 770 m || 
|-id=980 bgcolor=#E9E9E9
| 616980 ||  || — || August 6, 2002 || Palomar || NEAT ||  || align=right data-sort-value="0.68" | 680 m || 
|-id=981 bgcolor=#fefefe
| 616981 ||  || — || July 5, 2002 || Palomar || NEAT ||  || align=right data-sort-value="0.62" | 620 m || 
|-id=982 bgcolor=#fefefe
| 616982 ||  || — || July 22, 2002 || Palomar || NEAT ||  || align=right data-sort-value="0.57" | 570 m || 
|-id=983 bgcolor=#E9E9E9
| 616983 ||  || — || August 4, 2002 || Palomar || NEAT ||  || align=right | 1.5 km || 
|-id=984 bgcolor=#d6d6d6
| 616984 ||  || — || August 7, 2002 || Palomar || NEAT ||  || align=right | 2.6 km || 
|-id=985 bgcolor=#E9E9E9
| 616985 ||  || — || August 15, 2002 || Palomar || NEAT ||  || align=right data-sort-value="0.88" | 880 m || 
|-id=986 bgcolor=#fefefe
| 616986 ||  || — || November 18, 2006 || Mount Lemmon || Mount Lemmon Survey ||  || align=right data-sort-value="0.62" | 620 m || 
|-id=987 bgcolor=#d6d6d6
| 616987 ||  || — || August 15, 2002 || Palomar || NEAT ||  || align=right | 2.1 km || 
|-id=988 bgcolor=#d6d6d6
| 616988 ||  || — || July 15, 2002 || Palomar || NEAT ||  || align=right | 1.8 km || 
|-id=989 bgcolor=#fefefe
| 616989 ||  || — || April 16, 2004 || Apache Point || SDSS Collaboration ||  || align=right data-sort-value="0.66" | 660 m || 
|-id=990 bgcolor=#E9E9E9
| 616990 ||  || — || August 18, 2002 || Palomar || NEAT ||  || align=right data-sort-value="0.85" | 850 m || 
|-id=991 bgcolor=#E9E9E9
| 616991 ||  || — || August 21, 2006 || Cerro Tololo || L. H. Wasserman ||  || align=right data-sort-value="0.77" | 770 m || 
|-id=992 bgcolor=#E9E9E9
| 616992 ||  || — || July 21, 2006 || Mount Lemmon || Mount Lemmon Survey ||  || align=right data-sort-value="0.54" | 540 m || 
|-id=993 bgcolor=#E9E9E9
| 616993 ||  || — || July 12, 2002 || Palomar || NEAT ||  || align=right | 1.5 km || 
|-id=994 bgcolor=#fefefe
| 616994 ||  || — || October 26, 2009 || Mount Lemmon || Mount Lemmon Survey ||  || align=right data-sort-value="0.66" | 660 m || 
|-id=995 bgcolor=#fefefe
| 616995 ||  || — || June 16, 2012 || Haleakala || Pan-STARRS ||  || align=right data-sort-value="0.62" | 620 m || 
|-id=996 bgcolor=#fefefe
| 616996 ||  || — || May 13, 2005 || Mount Lemmon || Mount Lemmon Survey ||  || align=right data-sort-value="0.62" | 620 m || 
|-id=997 bgcolor=#E9E9E9
| 616997 ||  || — || January 31, 2008 || Mount Lemmon || Mount Lemmon Survey ||  || align=right data-sort-value="0.81" | 810 m || 
|-id=998 bgcolor=#E9E9E9
| 616998 ||  || — || November 9, 2007 || Kitt Peak || Spacewatch ||  || align=right data-sort-value="0.79" | 790 m || 
|-id=999 bgcolor=#FA8072
| 616999 ||  || — || August 16, 2002 || Palomar || NEAT || H || align=right data-sort-value="0.72" | 720 m || 
|-id=000 bgcolor=#fefefe
| 617000 ||  || — || August 29, 2002 || Palomar || NEAT ||  || align=right data-sort-value="0.80" | 800 m || 
|}

References

External links 
 Discovery Circumstances: Numbered Minor Planets (615001)–(620000) (IAU Minor Planet Center)

0616